

611001–611100 

|-bgcolor=#E9E9E9
| 611001 ||  || — || August 18, 2006 || Anderson Mesa || LONEOS ||  || align=right | 3.0 km || 
|-id=002 bgcolor=#fefefe
| 611002 ||  || — || August 17, 2006 || Palomar || NEAT ||  || align=right data-sort-value="0.73" | 730 m || 
|-id=003 bgcolor=#E9E9E9
| 611003 ||  || — || August 17, 2006 || Palomar || NEAT || GEF || align=right | 1.1 km || 
|-id=004 bgcolor=#fefefe
| 611004 ||  || — || July 22, 2006 || Mount Lemmon || Mount Lemmon Survey ||  || align=right data-sort-value="0.94" | 940 m || 
|-id=005 bgcolor=#fefefe
| 611005 ||  || — || August 22, 2006 || Palomar || NEAT ||  || align=right data-sort-value="0.67" | 670 m || 
|-id=006 bgcolor=#fefefe
| 611006 ||  || — || August 24, 2006 || Socorro || LINEAR || ERI || align=right | 1.5 km || 
|-id=007 bgcolor=#fefefe
| 611007 ||  || — || August 17, 2006 || Palomar || NEAT ||  || align=right data-sort-value="0.58" | 580 m || 
|-id=008 bgcolor=#fefefe
| 611008 ||  || — || August 20, 2006 || Palomar || NEAT ||  || align=right data-sort-value="0.54" | 540 m || 
|-id=009 bgcolor=#fefefe
| 611009 ||  || — || August 27, 2006 || Schiaparelli || L. Buzzi ||  || align=right data-sort-value="0.75" | 750 m || 
|-id=010 bgcolor=#E9E9E9
| 611010 ||  || — || July 18, 2006 || Siding Spring || SSS ||  || align=right | 2.1 km || 
|-id=011 bgcolor=#fefefe
| 611011 ||  || — || May 26, 2006 || Mount Lemmon || Mount Lemmon Survey ||  || align=right data-sort-value="0.72" | 720 m || 
|-id=012 bgcolor=#E9E9E9
| 611012 ||  || — || August 21, 2006 || Kitt Peak || Spacewatch ||  || align=right | 2.8 km || 
|-id=013 bgcolor=#E9E9E9
| 611013 ||  || — || August 21, 2006 || Kitt Peak || Spacewatch ||  || align=right | 1.8 km || 
|-id=014 bgcolor=#fefefe
| 611014 ||  || — || August 21, 2006 || Kitt Peak || Spacewatch ||  || align=right data-sort-value="0.70" | 700 m || 
|-id=015 bgcolor=#fefefe
| 611015 ||  || — || August 21, 2006 || Kitt Peak || Spacewatch ||  || align=right data-sort-value="0.76" | 760 m || 
|-id=016 bgcolor=#E9E9E9
| 611016 ||  || — || August 21, 2006 || Kitt Peak || Spacewatch ||  || align=right | 1.7 km || 
|-id=017 bgcolor=#fefefe
| 611017 ||  || — || August 22, 2006 || Palomar || NEAT ||  || align=right data-sort-value="0.70" | 700 m || 
|-id=018 bgcolor=#E9E9E9
| 611018 ||  || — || August 27, 2006 || Kitt Peak || Spacewatch ||  || align=right | 1.6 km || 
|-id=019 bgcolor=#E9E9E9
| 611019 ||  || — || August 27, 2006 || Kitt Peak || Spacewatch ||  || align=right | 1.8 km || 
|-id=020 bgcolor=#E9E9E9
| 611020 ||  || — || August 19, 2006 || Kitt Peak || Spacewatch ||  || align=right | 2.2 km || 
|-id=021 bgcolor=#fefefe
| 611021 ||  || — || August 17, 2006 || Palomar || NEAT ||  || align=right data-sort-value="0.74" | 740 m || 
|-id=022 bgcolor=#fefefe
| 611022 ||  || — || August 21, 2006 || Kitt Peak || Spacewatch ||  || align=right data-sort-value="0.64" | 640 m || 
|-id=023 bgcolor=#fefefe
| 611023 ||  || — || August 20, 2006 || Palomar || NEAT || V || align=right data-sort-value="0.70" | 700 m || 
|-id=024 bgcolor=#E9E9E9
| 611024 ||  || — || August 17, 2006 || Palomar || NEAT ||  || align=right | 2.2 km || 
|-id=025 bgcolor=#E9E9E9
| 611025 ||  || — || August 19, 2006 || Anderson Mesa || LONEOS ||  || align=right | 2.4 km || 
|-id=026 bgcolor=#fefefe
| 611026 ||  || — || August 22, 2006 || Palomar || NEAT ||  || align=right data-sort-value="0.78" | 780 m || 
|-id=027 bgcolor=#fefefe
| 611027 ||  || — || April 2, 2005 || Mount Lemmon || Mount Lemmon Survey ||  || align=right data-sort-value="0.77" | 770 m || 
|-id=028 bgcolor=#fefefe
| 611028 ||  || — || August 21, 2006 || Palomar || NEAT ||  || align=right | 1.0 km || 
|-id=029 bgcolor=#fefefe
| 611029 ||  || — || August 28, 2006 || Kitt Peak || Spacewatch ||  || align=right data-sort-value="0.72" | 720 m || 
|-id=030 bgcolor=#E9E9E9
| 611030 ||  || — || August 29, 2006 || Catalina || CSS || DOR || align=right | 1.9 km || 
|-id=031 bgcolor=#fefefe
| 611031 ||  || — || August 28, 2006 || Siding Spring || SSS ||  || align=right | 1.1 km || 
|-id=032 bgcolor=#fefefe
| 611032 ||  || — || November 3, 2007 || Mount Lemmon || Mount Lemmon Survey ||  || align=right data-sort-value="0.85" | 850 m || 
|-id=033 bgcolor=#d6d6d6
| 611033 ||  || — || June 21, 2006 || Catalina || CSS ||  || align=right | 4.6 km || 
|-id=034 bgcolor=#fefefe
| 611034 ||  || — || August 24, 2006 || Socorro || LINEAR ||  || align=right data-sort-value="0.84" | 840 m || 
|-id=035 bgcolor=#fefefe
| 611035 ||  || — || August 16, 2006 || Palomar || NEAT ||  || align=right data-sort-value="0.72" | 720 m || 
|-id=036 bgcolor=#E9E9E9
| 611036 ||  || — || August 18, 2006 || Kitt Peak || Spacewatch ||  || align=right | 1.6 km || 
|-id=037 bgcolor=#d6d6d6
| 611037 ||  || — || August 19, 2006 || Kitt Peak || Spacewatch ||  || align=right | 1.9 km || 
|-id=038 bgcolor=#E9E9E9
| 611038 ||  || — || August 19, 2006 || Kitt Peak || Spacewatch ||  || align=right | 2.7 km || 
|-id=039 bgcolor=#fefefe
| 611039 ||  || — || August 19, 2006 || Kitt Peak || Spacewatch ||  || align=right data-sort-value="0.63" | 630 m || 
|-id=040 bgcolor=#E9E9E9
| 611040 ||  || — || August 30, 2006 || Anderson Mesa || LONEOS ||  || align=right | 1.9 km || 
|-id=041 bgcolor=#E9E9E9
| 611041 ||  || — || August 27, 2006 || Kitt Peak || Spacewatch ||  || align=right | 1.6 km || 
|-id=042 bgcolor=#E9E9E9
| 611042 ||  || — || August 27, 2006 || Kitt Peak || Spacewatch ||  || align=right | 1.6 km || 
|-id=043 bgcolor=#E9E9E9
| 611043 ||  || — || August 28, 2006 || Kitt Peak || Spacewatch ||  || align=right | 2.0 km || 
|-id=044 bgcolor=#E9E9E9
| 611044 ||  || — || March 12, 2005 || Kitt Peak || Spacewatch ||  || align=right | 2.8 km || 
|-id=045 bgcolor=#fefefe
| 611045 ||  || — || January 11, 2008 || Kitt Peak || Spacewatch ||  || align=right data-sort-value="0.78" | 780 m || 
|-id=046 bgcolor=#fefefe
| 611046 ||  || — || August 18, 2006 || Kitt Peak || Spacewatch ||  || align=right data-sort-value="0.68" | 680 m || 
|-id=047 bgcolor=#fefefe
| 611047 ||  || — || August 28, 2006 || Catalina || CSS ||  || align=right data-sort-value="0.67" | 670 m || 
|-id=048 bgcolor=#fefefe
| 611048 ||  || — || August 26, 2013 || Haleakala || Pan-STARRS ||  || align=right data-sort-value="0.65" | 650 m || 
|-id=049 bgcolor=#C2FFFF
| 611049 ||  || — || August 27, 2006 || Kitt Peak || Spacewatch || L4 || align=right | 7.3 km || 
|-id=050 bgcolor=#fefefe
| 611050 ||  || — || June 20, 2013 || Mount Lemmon || Mount Lemmon Survey ||  || align=right data-sort-value="0.65" | 650 m || 
|-id=051 bgcolor=#fefefe
| 611051 ||  || — || August 19, 2006 || Kitt Peak || Spacewatch ||  || align=right data-sort-value="0.54" | 540 m || 
|-id=052 bgcolor=#fefefe
| 611052 ||  || — || August 27, 2006 || Kitt Peak || Spacewatch ||  || align=right data-sort-value="0.56" | 560 m || 
|-id=053 bgcolor=#d6d6d6
| 611053 ||  || — || October 2, 2016 || Mount Lemmon || Mount Lemmon Survey ||  || align=right | 1.8 km || 
|-id=054 bgcolor=#E9E9E9
| 611054 ||  || — || November 7, 2007 || Kitt Peak || Spacewatch ||  || align=right | 1.6 km || 
|-id=055 bgcolor=#E9E9E9
| 611055 ||  || — || September 4, 2011 || Haleakala || Pan-STARRS ||  || align=right | 1.6 km || 
|-id=056 bgcolor=#E9E9E9
| 611056 ||  || — || August 27, 2006 || Kitt Peak || Spacewatch ||  || align=right | 1.9 km || 
|-id=057 bgcolor=#fefefe
| 611057 ||  || — || August 29, 2006 || Lulin || LUSS ||  || align=right data-sort-value="0.57" | 570 m || 
|-id=058 bgcolor=#d6d6d6
| 611058 ||  || — || August 18, 2006 || Kitt Peak || Spacewatch ||  || align=right | 1.8 km || 
|-id=059 bgcolor=#d6d6d6
| 611059 ||  || — || August 28, 2006 || Kitt Peak || Spacewatch ||  || align=right | 1.6 km || 
|-id=060 bgcolor=#E9E9E9
| 611060 ||  || — || August 21, 2006 || Kitt Peak || Spacewatch ||  || align=right | 1.8 km || 
|-id=061 bgcolor=#E9E9E9
| 611061 ||  || — || August 27, 2006 || Kitt Peak || Spacewatch ||  || align=right | 1.7 km || 
|-id=062 bgcolor=#E9E9E9
| 611062 ||  || — || August 29, 2006 || Kitt Peak || Spacewatch ||  || align=right | 1.7 km || 
|-id=063 bgcolor=#E9E9E9
| 611063 ||  || — || August 19, 2006 || Kitt Peak || Spacewatch ||  || align=right | 1.4 km || 
|-id=064 bgcolor=#E9E9E9
| 611064 ||  || — || September 14, 2006 || Mauna Kea || Mauna Kea Obs. ||  || align=right | 3.0 km || 
|-id=065 bgcolor=#fefefe
| 611065 ||  || — || August 24, 2006 || Palomar || NEAT ||  || align=right data-sort-value="0.75" | 750 m || 
|-id=066 bgcolor=#fefefe
| 611066 ||  || — || August 22, 2006 || Palomar || NEAT ||  || align=right data-sort-value="0.93" | 930 m || 
|-id=067 bgcolor=#fefefe
| 611067 ||  || — || September 14, 2006 || Kitt Peak || Spacewatch ||  || align=right data-sort-value="0.65" | 650 m || 
|-id=068 bgcolor=#fefefe
| 611068 ||  || — || August 18, 2006 || Kitt Peak || Spacewatch ||  || align=right data-sort-value="0.81" | 810 m || 
|-id=069 bgcolor=#E9E9E9
| 611069 ||  || — || August 28, 2006 || Goodricke-Pigott || R. A. Tucker ||  || align=right | 2.9 km || 
|-id=070 bgcolor=#fefefe
| 611070 ||  || — || July 21, 2006 || Lulin || LUSS ||  || align=right data-sort-value="0.85" | 850 m || 
|-id=071 bgcolor=#E9E9E9
| 611071 ||  || — || September 14, 2006 || Kitt Peak || Spacewatch ||  || align=right | 2.8 km || 
|-id=072 bgcolor=#fefefe
| 611072 ||  || — || August 22, 2006 || Palomar || NEAT ||  || align=right data-sort-value="0.84" | 840 m || 
|-id=073 bgcolor=#E9E9E9
| 611073 ||  || — || August 28, 2006 || Goodricke-Pigott || R. A. Tucker || EUN || align=right | 1.7 km || 
|-id=074 bgcolor=#E9E9E9
| 611074 ||  || — || August 22, 2006 || Palomar || NEAT ||  || align=right | 2.9 km || 
|-id=075 bgcolor=#E9E9E9
| 611075 ||  || — || September 14, 2006 || Kitt Peak || Spacewatch ||  || align=right | 2.1 km || 
|-id=076 bgcolor=#fefefe
| 611076 ||  || — || September 14, 2006 || Kitt Peak || Spacewatch ||  || align=right data-sort-value="0.58" | 580 m || 
|-id=077 bgcolor=#d6d6d6
| 611077 ||  || — || September 14, 2006 || Kitt Peak || Spacewatch ||  || align=right | 1.9 km || 
|-id=078 bgcolor=#d6d6d6
| 611078 ||  || — || September 14, 2006 || Kitt Peak || Spacewatch ||  || align=right | 1.7 km || 
|-id=079 bgcolor=#E9E9E9
| 611079 ||  || — || September 15, 2006 || Kitt Peak || Spacewatch ||  || align=right | 2.0 km || 
|-id=080 bgcolor=#E9E9E9
| 611080 ||  || — || September 15, 2006 || Kitt Peak || Spacewatch ||  || align=right | 1.7 km || 
|-id=081 bgcolor=#E9E9E9
| 611081 ||  || — || September 15, 2006 || Kitt Peak || Spacewatch ||  || align=right | 1.8 km || 
|-id=082 bgcolor=#E9E9E9
| 611082 ||  || — || September 15, 2006 || Kitt Peak || Spacewatch ||  || align=right | 1.6 km || 
|-id=083 bgcolor=#fefefe
| 611083 ||  || — || September 15, 2006 || Kitt Peak || Spacewatch ||  || align=right data-sort-value="0.64" | 640 m || 
|-id=084 bgcolor=#E9E9E9
| 611084 ||  || — || September 15, 2006 || Kitt Peak || Spacewatch ||  || align=right | 1.9 km || 
|-id=085 bgcolor=#E9E9E9
| 611085 ||  || — || September 26, 2006 || Kitt Peak || Spacewatch ||  || align=right data-sort-value="0.95" | 950 m || 
|-id=086 bgcolor=#E9E9E9
| 611086 ||  || — || September 25, 2006 || Mount Lemmon || Mount Lemmon Survey ||  || align=right | 2.2 km || 
|-id=087 bgcolor=#d6d6d6
| 611087 ||  || — || September 14, 2006 || Mauna Kea || J. Masiero, R. Jedicke ||  || align=right | 1.5 km || 
|-id=088 bgcolor=#fefefe
| 611088 ||  || — || September 14, 2006 || Mauna Kea || J. Masiero, R. Jedicke ||  || align=right data-sort-value="0.62" | 620 m || 
|-id=089 bgcolor=#d6d6d6
| 611089 ||  || — || September 14, 2006 || Kitt Peak || Spacewatch ||  || align=right | 1.6 km || 
|-id=090 bgcolor=#d6d6d6
| 611090 ||  || — || September 14, 2006 || Mauna Kea || J. Masiero, R. Jedicke ||  || align=right | 1.5 km || 
|-id=091 bgcolor=#fefefe
| 611091 ||  || — || September 25, 2006 || Mount Lemmon || Mount Lemmon Survey || MAS || align=right data-sort-value="0.69" | 690 m || 
|-id=092 bgcolor=#d6d6d6
| 611092 ||  || — || September 15, 2006 || Kitt Peak || Spacewatch || 7:4 || align=right | 2.5 km || 
|-id=093 bgcolor=#d6d6d6
| 611093 ||  || — || September 15, 2006 || Kitt Peak || Spacewatch ||  || align=right | 1.7 km || 
|-id=094 bgcolor=#E9E9E9
| 611094 ||  || — || September 15, 2006 || Kitt Peak || Spacewatch ||  || align=right | 1.7 km || 
|-id=095 bgcolor=#d6d6d6
| 611095 ||  || — || September 15, 2006 || Kitt Peak || Spacewatch ||  || align=right | 1.9 km || 
|-id=096 bgcolor=#E9E9E9
| 611096 ||  || — || September 16, 2006 || Kitt Peak || Spacewatch ||  || align=right | 2.0 km || 
|-id=097 bgcolor=#fefefe
| 611097 ||  || — || September 17, 2006 || Kitt Peak || Spacewatch ||  || align=right data-sort-value="0.64" | 640 m || 
|-id=098 bgcolor=#fefefe
| 611098 ||  || — || September 17, 2006 || Kitt Peak || Spacewatch ||  || align=right data-sort-value="0.67" | 670 m || 
|-id=099 bgcolor=#fefefe
| 611099 ||  || — || August 29, 2006 || Catalina || CSS ||  || align=right data-sort-value="0.79" | 790 m || 
|-id=100 bgcolor=#E9E9E9
| 611100 ||  || — || September 17, 2006 || Kitt Peak || Spacewatch ||  || align=right data-sort-value="0.51" | 510 m || 
|}

611101–611200 

|-bgcolor=#d6d6d6
| 611101 ||  || — || September 17, 2006 || Kitt Peak || Spacewatch ||  || align=right | 1.6 km || 
|-id=102 bgcolor=#fefefe
| 611102 ||  || — || September 14, 2006 || Kitt Peak || Spacewatch || H || align=right data-sort-value="0.48" | 480 m || 
|-id=103 bgcolor=#fefefe
| 611103 ||  || — || August 29, 2006 || Catalina || CSS ||  || align=right data-sort-value="0.84" | 840 m || 
|-id=104 bgcolor=#E9E9E9
| 611104 ||  || — || September 18, 2006 || Kitt Peak || Spacewatch ||  || align=right | 2.5 km || 
|-id=105 bgcolor=#fefefe
| 611105 ||  || — || September 18, 2006 || Socorro || LINEAR || (2076) || align=right data-sort-value="0.80" | 800 m || 
|-id=106 bgcolor=#fefefe
| 611106 ||  || — || September 19, 2006 || Catalina || CSS ||  || align=right data-sort-value="0.79" | 790 m || 
|-id=107 bgcolor=#E9E9E9
| 611107 ||  || — || September 16, 2006 || Catalina || CSS ||  || align=right | 3.0 km || 
|-id=108 bgcolor=#E9E9E9
| 611108 ||  || — || August 28, 2006 || Kitt Peak || Spacewatch ||  || align=right | 1.6 km || 
|-id=109 bgcolor=#E9E9E9
| 611109 ||  || — || September 19, 2006 || Kitt Peak || Spacewatch ||  || align=right | 2.0 km || 
|-id=110 bgcolor=#d6d6d6
| 611110 ||  || — || March 15, 2004 || Kitt Peak || Spacewatch ||  || align=right | 2.0 km || 
|-id=111 bgcolor=#E9E9E9
| 611111 ||  || — || September 20, 2006 || Kitt Peak || Spacewatch || DOR || align=right | 2.2 km || 
|-id=112 bgcolor=#E9E9E9
| 611112 ||  || — || December 5, 2007 || Kitt Peak || Spacewatch || AGN || align=right | 1.3 km || 
|-id=113 bgcolor=#fefefe
| 611113 ||  || — || September 18, 2006 || Kitt Peak || Spacewatch ||  || align=right data-sort-value="0.62" | 620 m || 
|-id=114 bgcolor=#E9E9E9
| 611114 ||  || — || September 18, 2006 || Kitt Peak || Spacewatch ||  || align=right | 1.8 km || 
|-id=115 bgcolor=#fefefe
| 611115 ||  || — || September 14, 2006 || Kitt Peak || Spacewatch ||  || align=right data-sort-value="0.49" | 490 m || 
|-id=116 bgcolor=#fefefe
| 611116 ||  || — || September 18, 2006 || Kitt Peak || Spacewatch ||  || align=right data-sort-value="0.81" | 810 m || 
|-id=117 bgcolor=#fefefe
| 611117 ||  || — || September 19, 2006 || Kitt Peak || Spacewatch ||  || align=right data-sort-value="0.50" | 500 m || 
|-id=118 bgcolor=#d6d6d6
| 611118 ||  || — || September 19, 2006 || Kitt Peak || Spacewatch || KOR || align=right data-sort-value="0.98" | 980 m || 
|-id=119 bgcolor=#E9E9E9
| 611119 ||  || — || September 19, 2006 || Kitt Peak || Spacewatch ||  || align=right | 1.7 km || 
|-id=120 bgcolor=#E9E9E9
| 611120 ||  || — || September 19, 2006 || Kitt Peak || Spacewatch ||  || align=right | 1.9 km || 
|-id=121 bgcolor=#E9E9E9
| 611121 ||  || — || September 19, 2006 || Kitt Peak || Spacewatch ||  || align=right | 2.0 km || 
|-id=122 bgcolor=#E9E9E9
| 611122 ||  || — || September 19, 2006 || Kitt Peak || Spacewatch ||  || align=right | 1.8 km || 
|-id=123 bgcolor=#fefefe
| 611123 ||  || — || September 19, 2006 || Kitt Peak || Spacewatch ||  || align=right data-sort-value="0.62" | 620 m || 
|-id=124 bgcolor=#E9E9E9
| 611124 ||  || — || September 20, 2006 || Kitt Peak || Spacewatch ||  || align=right | 1.6 km || 
|-id=125 bgcolor=#fefefe
| 611125 ||  || — || September 14, 2006 || Kitt Peak || Spacewatch || MAS || align=right data-sort-value="0.60" | 600 m || 
|-id=126 bgcolor=#E9E9E9
| 611126 ||  || — || August 27, 2006 || Kitt Peak || Spacewatch ||  || align=right | 2.0 km || 
|-id=127 bgcolor=#fefefe
| 611127 ||  || — || September 16, 2006 || Catalina || CSS ||  || align=right data-sort-value="0.80" | 800 m || 
|-id=128 bgcolor=#fefefe
| 611128 ||  || — || August 13, 2006 || Palomar || NEAT ||  || align=right data-sort-value="0.73" | 730 m || 
|-id=129 bgcolor=#fefefe
| 611129 ||  || — || September 20, 2006 || Catalina || CSS ||  || align=right data-sort-value="0.75" | 750 m || 
|-id=130 bgcolor=#fefefe
| 611130 ||  || — || September 20, 2006 || Palomar || NEAT ||  || align=right | 1.0 km || 
|-id=131 bgcolor=#E9E9E9
| 611131 ||  || — || September 22, 2006 || Catalina || CSS ||  || align=right | 2.6 km || 
|-id=132 bgcolor=#d6d6d6
| 611132 ||  || — || September 19, 2006 || Kitt Peak || Spacewatch ||  || align=right | 1.6 km || 
|-id=133 bgcolor=#fefefe
| 611133 ||  || — || September 19, 2006 || Kitt Peak || Spacewatch ||  || align=right data-sort-value="0.58" | 580 m || 
|-id=134 bgcolor=#E9E9E9
| 611134 ||  || — || September 20, 2006 || Kitt Peak || Spacewatch || AST || align=right | 1.4 km || 
|-id=135 bgcolor=#fefefe
| 611135 ||  || — || October 30, 1999 || Kitt Peak || Spacewatch ||  || align=right data-sort-value="0.65" | 650 m || 
|-id=136 bgcolor=#fefefe
| 611136 ||  || — || July 21, 2006 || Mount Lemmon || Mount Lemmon Survey ||  || align=right data-sort-value="0.59" | 590 m || 
|-id=137 bgcolor=#d6d6d6
| 611137 ||  || — || September 24, 2006 || Kitt Peak || Spacewatch ||  || align=right | 1.8 km || 
|-id=138 bgcolor=#E9E9E9
| 611138 ||  || — || September 25, 2006 || Kitt Peak || Spacewatch ||  || align=right | 1.9 km || 
|-id=139 bgcolor=#fefefe
| 611139 ||  || — || April 7, 2005 || Kitt Peak || Spacewatch ||  || align=right data-sort-value="0.81" | 810 m || 
|-id=140 bgcolor=#E9E9E9
| 611140 ||  || — || September 17, 2006 || Kitt Peak || Spacewatch ||  || align=right | 2.1 km || 
|-id=141 bgcolor=#d6d6d6
| 611141 ||  || — || September 17, 2006 || Kitt Peak || Spacewatch ||  || align=right | 1.8 km || 
|-id=142 bgcolor=#E9E9E9
| 611142 ||  || — || September 17, 2006 || Kitt Peak || Spacewatch ||  || align=right | 1.8 km || 
|-id=143 bgcolor=#d6d6d6
| 611143 ||  || — || September 25, 2006 || Kitt Peak || Spacewatch ||  || align=right | 1.8 km || 
|-id=144 bgcolor=#E9E9E9
| 611144 ||  || — || September 25, 2006 || Kitt Peak || Spacewatch ||  || align=right data-sort-value="0.92" | 920 m || 
|-id=145 bgcolor=#E9E9E9
| 611145 ||  || — || September 25, 2006 || Kitt Peak || Spacewatch ||  || align=right | 1.6 km || 
|-id=146 bgcolor=#E9E9E9
| 611146 ||  || — || September 25, 2006 || Mount Lemmon || Mount Lemmon Survey ||  || align=right | 2.2 km || 
|-id=147 bgcolor=#d6d6d6
| 611147 ||  || — || September 25, 2006 || Mount Lemmon || Mount Lemmon Survey ||  || align=right | 1.6 km || 
|-id=148 bgcolor=#fefefe
| 611148 ||  || — || September 25, 2006 || Kitt Peak || Spacewatch ||  || align=right data-sort-value="0.77" | 770 m || 
|-id=149 bgcolor=#fefefe
| 611149 ||  || — || August 23, 2006 || Palomar || NEAT ||  || align=right data-sort-value="0.73" | 730 m || 
|-id=150 bgcolor=#fefefe
| 611150 ||  || — || September 26, 2006 || Mount Lemmon || Mount Lemmon Survey ||  || align=right data-sort-value="0.81" | 810 m || 
|-id=151 bgcolor=#d6d6d6
| 611151 ||  || — || September 23, 2006 || Kitt Peak || Spacewatch ||  || align=right | 1.9 km || 
|-id=152 bgcolor=#E9E9E9
| 611152 ||  || — || September 26, 2006 || Mount Lemmon || Mount Lemmon Survey ||  || align=right | 1.5 km || 
|-id=153 bgcolor=#E9E9E9
| 611153 ||  || — || March 26, 2004 || Kitt Peak || Spacewatch ||  || align=right | 2.1 km || 
|-id=154 bgcolor=#E9E9E9
| 611154 ||  || — || September 27, 2006 || Kitt Peak || Spacewatch ||  || align=right | 1.7 km || 
|-id=155 bgcolor=#E9E9E9
| 611155 ||  || — || September 26, 2006 || Kitt Peak || Spacewatch ||  || align=right | 2.0 km || 
|-id=156 bgcolor=#d6d6d6
| 611156 ||  || — || September 26, 2006 || Kitt Peak || Spacewatch ||  || align=right | 1.9 km || 
|-id=157 bgcolor=#E9E9E9
| 611157 ||  || — || February 14, 2004 || Kitt Peak || Spacewatch ||  || align=right | 2.3 km || 
|-id=158 bgcolor=#d6d6d6
| 611158 ||  || — || September 26, 2006 || Kitt Peak || Spacewatch ||  || align=right | 2.1 km || 
|-id=159 bgcolor=#E9E9E9
| 611159 ||  || — || August 19, 2001 || Cerro Tololo || Cerro Tololo Obs. || MRX || align=right data-sort-value="0.91" | 910 m || 
|-id=160 bgcolor=#d6d6d6
| 611160 ||  || — || September 26, 2006 || Kitt Peak || Spacewatch ||  || align=right | 1.5 km || 
|-id=161 bgcolor=#E9E9E9
| 611161 ||  || — || September 26, 2006 || Kitt Peak || Spacewatch ||  || align=right | 1.9 km || 
|-id=162 bgcolor=#fefefe
| 611162 ||  || — || September 18, 2006 || Kitt Peak || Spacewatch ||  || align=right data-sort-value="0.68" | 680 m || 
|-id=163 bgcolor=#fefefe
| 611163 ||  || — || September 26, 2006 || Mount Lemmon || Mount Lemmon Survey ||  || align=right data-sort-value="0.56" | 560 m || 
|-id=164 bgcolor=#d6d6d6
| 611164 ||  || — || September 12, 2001 || Kitt Peak || Spacewatch ||  || align=right | 1.9 km || 
|-id=165 bgcolor=#d6d6d6
| 611165 ||  || — || September 26, 2006 || Kitt Peak || Spacewatch ||  || align=right | 1.8 km || 
|-id=166 bgcolor=#E9E9E9
| 611166 ||  || — || September 26, 2006 || Mount Lemmon || Mount Lemmon Survey ||  || align=right | 1.6 km || 
|-id=167 bgcolor=#E9E9E9
| 611167 ||  || — || August 19, 2006 || Kitt Peak || Spacewatch ||  || align=right | 1.8 km || 
|-id=168 bgcolor=#fefefe
| 611168 ||  || — || May 13, 2005 || Kitt Peak || Spacewatch ||  || align=right data-sort-value="0.90" | 900 m || 
|-id=169 bgcolor=#E9E9E9
| 611169 ||  || — || September 28, 2006 || Kitt Peak || Spacewatch ||  || align=right | 1.9 km || 
|-id=170 bgcolor=#d6d6d6
| 611170 ||  || — || September 17, 2006 || Kitt Peak || Spacewatch ||  || align=right | 1.7 km || 
|-id=171 bgcolor=#E9E9E9
| 611171 ||  || — || September 27, 2006 || Kitt Peak || Spacewatch ||  || align=right | 2.4 km || 
|-id=172 bgcolor=#E9E9E9
| 611172 ||  || — || September 17, 2006 || Kitt Peak || Spacewatch ||  || align=right | 1.9 km || 
|-id=173 bgcolor=#E9E9E9
| 611173 ||  || — || September 27, 2006 || Kitt Peak || Spacewatch ||  || align=right | 1.6 km || 
|-id=174 bgcolor=#fefefe
| 611174 ||  || — || September 27, 2006 || Kitt Peak || Spacewatch ||  || align=right data-sort-value="0.68" | 680 m || 
|-id=175 bgcolor=#E9E9E9
| 611175 ||  || — || July 21, 2006 || Mount Lemmon || Mount Lemmon Survey ||  || align=right | 1.8 km || 
|-id=176 bgcolor=#d6d6d6
| 611176 ||  || — || September 19, 2006 || Kitt Peak || Spacewatch ||  || align=right | 1.8 km || 
|-id=177 bgcolor=#E9E9E9
| 611177 ||  || — || September 27, 2006 || Kitt Peak || Spacewatch ||  || align=right | 1.8 km || 
|-id=178 bgcolor=#d6d6d6
| 611178 ||  || — || September 27, 2006 || Kitt Peak || Spacewatch ||  || align=right | 1.9 km || 
|-id=179 bgcolor=#E9E9E9
| 611179 ||  || — || September 28, 2006 || Kitt Peak || Spacewatch ||  || align=right | 2.5 km || 
|-id=180 bgcolor=#d6d6d6
| 611180 ||  || — || September 28, 2006 || Kitt Peak || Spacewatch ||  || align=right | 1.9 km || 
|-id=181 bgcolor=#E9E9E9
| 611181 ||  || — || September 28, 2006 || Kitt Peak || Spacewatch ||  || align=right | 2.0 km || 
|-id=182 bgcolor=#E9E9E9
| 611182 ||  || — || September 14, 2006 || Kitt Peak || Spacewatch ||  || align=right | 1.9 km || 
|-id=183 bgcolor=#E9E9E9
| 611183 ||  || — || September 28, 2006 || Kitt Peak || Spacewatch ||  || align=right | 2.5 km || 
|-id=184 bgcolor=#d6d6d6
| 611184 ||  || — || September 14, 2006 || Kitt Peak || Spacewatch ||  || align=right | 2.1 km || 
|-id=185 bgcolor=#E9E9E9
| 611185 ||  || — || September 28, 2006 || Kitt Peak || Spacewatch ||  || align=right | 1.9 km || 
|-id=186 bgcolor=#E9E9E9
| 611186 ||  || — || September 28, 2006 || Kitt Peak || Spacewatch ||  || align=right | 1.7 km || 
|-id=187 bgcolor=#E9E9E9
| 611187 ||  || — || September 28, 2006 || Kitt Peak || Spacewatch ||  || align=right | 2.4 km || 
|-id=188 bgcolor=#E9E9E9
| 611188 ||  || — || September 28, 2006 || Kitt Peak || Spacewatch ||  || align=right | 1.9 km || 
|-id=189 bgcolor=#fefefe
| 611189 ||  || — || September 28, 2006 || Kitt Peak || Spacewatch ||  || align=right data-sort-value="0.70" | 700 m || 
|-id=190 bgcolor=#d6d6d6
| 611190 ||  || — || September 24, 2006 || Kitt Peak || Spacewatch || KOR || align=right data-sort-value="0.98" | 980 m || 
|-id=191 bgcolor=#E9E9E9
| 611191 ||  || — || September 18, 2006 || Kitt Peak || Spacewatch ||  || align=right | 2.2 km || 
|-id=192 bgcolor=#E9E9E9
| 611192 ||  || — || September 30, 2006 || Mount Lemmon || Mount Lemmon Survey ||  || align=right | 2.1 km || 
|-id=193 bgcolor=#E9E9E9
| 611193 ||  || — || September 30, 2006 || Mount Lemmon || Mount Lemmon Survey ||  || align=right | 2.4 km || 
|-id=194 bgcolor=#E9E9E9
| 611194 ||  || — || September 27, 2006 || Kitt Peak || Spacewatch ||  || align=right | 2.1 km || 
|-id=195 bgcolor=#E9E9E9
| 611195 ||  || — || September 19, 2006 || Catalina || CSS ||  || align=right | 1.9 km || 
|-id=196 bgcolor=#E9E9E9
| 611196 ||  || — || September 27, 2006 || Apache Point || SDSS Collaboration ||  || align=right | 2.0 km || 
|-id=197 bgcolor=#d6d6d6
| 611197 ||  || — || September 27, 2006 || Apache Point || SDSS Collaboration ||  || align=right | 2.5 km || 
|-id=198 bgcolor=#d6d6d6
| 611198 ||  || — || September 18, 2006 || Apache Point || SDSS Collaboration || 7:4 || align=right | 4.2 km || 
|-id=199 bgcolor=#E9E9E9
| 611199 ||  || — || September 30, 2006 || Apache Point || SDSS Collaboration ||  || align=right | 2.3 km || 
|-id=200 bgcolor=#fefefe
| 611200 ||  || — || August 28, 2006 || Apache Point || SDSS Collaboration || V || align=right data-sort-value="0.44" | 440 m || 
|}

611201–611300 

|-bgcolor=#fefefe
| 611201 ||  || — || September 28, 2006 || Mount Lemmon || Mount Lemmon Survey ||  || align=right data-sort-value="0.57" | 570 m || 
|-id=202 bgcolor=#E9E9E9
| 611202 ||  || — || September 27, 2006 || Mount Lemmon || Mount Lemmon Survey ||  || align=right | 1.1 km || 
|-id=203 bgcolor=#E9E9E9
| 611203 ||  || — || September 18, 2006 || Kitt Peak || Spacewatch ||  || align=right | 1.8 km || 
|-id=204 bgcolor=#fefefe
| 611204 ||  || — || September 25, 2006 || Kitt Peak || Spacewatch ||  || align=right data-sort-value="0.47" | 470 m || 
|-id=205 bgcolor=#E9E9E9
| 611205 ||  || — || August 19, 2006 || Kitt Peak || Spacewatch ||  || align=right | 1.7 km || 
|-id=206 bgcolor=#E9E9E9
| 611206 ||  || — || September 17, 2006 || Kitt Peak || Spacewatch ||  || align=right data-sort-value="0.67" | 670 m || 
|-id=207 bgcolor=#E9E9E9
| 611207 ||  || — || September 30, 2006 || Mount Lemmon || Mount Lemmon Survey ||  || align=right | 1.7 km || 
|-id=208 bgcolor=#d6d6d6
| 611208 ||  || — || September 30, 2006 || Mount Lemmon || Mount Lemmon Survey ||  || align=right | 1.8 km || 
|-id=209 bgcolor=#E9E9E9
| 611209 ||  || — || September 28, 2006 || Kitt Peak || Spacewatch ||  || align=right | 1.3 km || 
|-id=210 bgcolor=#fefefe
| 611210 ||  || — || December 21, 2014 || Haleakala || Pan-STARRS ||  || align=right data-sort-value="0.73" | 730 m || 
|-id=211 bgcolor=#E9E9E9
| 611211 ||  || — || January 10, 2013 || Haleakala || Pan-STARRS ||  || align=right | 2.2 km || 
|-id=212 bgcolor=#fefefe
| 611212 ||  || — || September 25, 2006 || Mount Lemmon || Mount Lemmon Survey ||  || align=right data-sort-value="0.43" | 430 m || 
|-id=213 bgcolor=#d6d6d6
| 611213 ||  || — || September 25, 2006 || Catalina || CSS ||  || align=right | 2.6 km || 
|-id=214 bgcolor=#E9E9E9
| 611214 ||  || — || September 15, 2006 || Kitt Peak || Spacewatch ||  || align=right | 1.5 km || 
|-id=215 bgcolor=#fefefe
| 611215 ||  || — || September 18, 2006 || Kitt Peak || Spacewatch ||  || align=right data-sort-value="0.63" | 630 m || 
|-id=216 bgcolor=#fefefe
| 611216 ||  || — || September 25, 2006 || Kitt Peak || Spacewatch ||  || align=right data-sort-value="0.64" | 640 m || 
|-id=217 bgcolor=#fefefe
| 611217 ||  || — || February 17, 2015 || Haleakala || Pan-STARRS ||  || align=right data-sort-value="0.57" | 570 m || 
|-id=218 bgcolor=#fefefe
| 611218 ||  || — || September 27, 2006 || Kitt Peak || Spacewatch ||  || align=right data-sort-value="0.65" | 650 m || 
|-id=219 bgcolor=#fefefe
| 611219 ||  || — || July 1, 2013 || Haleakala || Pan-STARRS ||  || align=right data-sort-value="0.55" | 550 m || 
|-id=220 bgcolor=#fefefe
| 611220 ||  || — || September 19, 2006 || Kitt Peak || Spacewatch ||  || align=right data-sort-value="0.50" | 500 m || 
|-id=221 bgcolor=#fefefe
| 611221 ||  || — || February 1, 2015 || Haleakala || Pan-STARRS ||  || align=right data-sort-value="0.51" | 510 m || 
|-id=222 bgcolor=#fefefe
| 611222 ||  || — || September 17, 2006 || Kitt Peak || Spacewatch ||  || align=right data-sort-value="0.58" | 580 m || 
|-id=223 bgcolor=#fefefe
| 611223 ||  || — || December 31, 2007 || Mount Lemmon || Mount Lemmon Survey ||  || align=right data-sort-value="0.81" | 810 m || 
|-id=224 bgcolor=#E9E9E9
| 611224 ||  || — || December 18, 2007 || Kitt Peak || Spacewatch ||  || align=right | 1.8 km || 
|-id=225 bgcolor=#fefefe
| 611225 ||  || — || October 21, 2017 || Mount Lemmon || Mount Lemmon Survey ||  || align=right data-sort-value="0.63" | 630 m || 
|-id=226 bgcolor=#E9E9E9
| 611226 ||  || — || December 18, 2007 || Mount Lemmon || Mount Lemmon Survey ||  || align=right | 1.8 km || 
|-id=227 bgcolor=#fefefe
| 611227 ||  || — || March 13, 2012 || Mount Lemmon || Mount Lemmon Survey ||  || align=right data-sort-value="0.54" | 540 m || 
|-id=228 bgcolor=#E9E9E9
| 611228 ||  || — || September 15, 2006 || Kitt Peak || Spacewatch ||  || align=right | 1.7 km || 
|-id=229 bgcolor=#fefefe
| 611229 ||  || — || October 30, 2017 || Haleakala || Pan-STARRS ||  || align=right data-sort-value="0.59" | 590 m || 
|-id=230 bgcolor=#E9E9E9
| 611230 ||  || — || March 5, 2013 || Elena Remote || A. Oreshko ||  || align=right | 1.8 km || 
|-id=231 bgcolor=#fefefe
| 611231 ||  || — || February 25, 2012 || Catalina || CSS ||  || align=right data-sort-value="0.78" | 780 m || 
|-id=232 bgcolor=#d6d6d6
| 611232 ||  || — || September 17, 2006 || Kitt Peak || Spacewatch ||  || align=right | 1.8 km || 
|-id=233 bgcolor=#E9E9E9
| 611233 ||  || — || September 2, 2011 || Haleakala || Pan-STARRS ||  || align=right | 1.7 km || 
|-id=234 bgcolor=#E9E9E9
| 611234 ||  || — || October 24, 2011 || Haleakala || Pan-STARRS ||  || align=right | 1.7 km || 
|-id=235 bgcolor=#E9E9E9
| 611235 ||  || — || May 6, 2014 || Haleakala || Pan-STARRS ||  || align=right | 1.8 km || 
|-id=236 bgcolor=#E9E9E9
| 611236 ||  || — || October 21, 2011 || Kitt Peak || Spacewatch ||  || align=right | 1.8 km || 
|-id=237 bgcolor=#d6d6d6
| 611237 ||  || — || December 23, 2012 || Haleakala || Pan-STARRS ||  || align=right | 1.6 km || 
|-id=238 bgcolor=#fefefe
| 611238 ||  || — || September 16, 2006 || Kitt Peak || Spacewatch ||  || align=right data-sort-value="0.56" | 560 m || 
|-id=239 bgcolor=#fefefe
| 611239 ||  || — || September 30, 2006 || Mount Lemmon || Mount Lemmon Survey ||  || align=right data-sort-value="0.58" | 580 m || 
|-id=240 bgcolor=#d6d6d6
| 611240 ||  || — || September 17, 2006 || Kitt Peak || Spacewatch ||  || align=right | 1.6 km || 
|-id=241 bgcolor=#E9E9E9
| 611241 ||  || — || September 20, 2006 || Catalina || CSS ||  || align=right | 1.9 km || 
|-id=242 bgcolor=#E9E9E9
| 611242 ||  || — || September 18, 2006 || Kitt Peak || Spacewatch ||  || align=right | 1.7 km || 
|-id=243 bgcolor=#E9E9E9
| 611243 ||  || — || September 28, 2006 || Kitt Peak || Spacewatch ||  || align=right | 1.6 km || 
|-id=244 bgcolor=#d6d6d6
| 611244 ||  || — || September 27, 2006 || Mount Lemmon || Mount Lemmon Survey ||  || align=right | 1.9 km || 
|-id=245 bgcolor=#E9E9E9
| 611245 ||  || — || September 25, 2006 || Kitt Peak || Spacewatch ||  || align=right | 1.7 km || 
|-id=246 bgcolor=#d6d6d6
| 611246 ||  || — || September 27, 2006 || Mount Lemmon || Mount Lemmon Survey ||  || align=right | 2.1 km || 
|-id=247 bgcolor=#d6d6d6
| 611247 ||  || — || September 25, 2006 || Kitt Peak || Spacewatch ||  || align=right | 1.8 km || 
|-id=248 bgcolor=#d6d6d6
| 611248 ||  || — || October 2, 2006 || Mount Lemmon || Mount Lemmon Survey ||  || align=right | 1.6 km || 
|-id=249 bgcolor=#E9E9E9
| 611249 ||  || — || July 5, 2005 || Mount Lemmon || Mount Lemmon Survey ||  || align=right | 2.5 km || 
|-id=250 bgcolor=#fefefe
| 611250 ||  || — || September 28, 2006 || Kitt Peak || Spacewatch ||  || align=right data-sort-value="0.62" | 620 m || 
|-id=251 bgcolor=#fefefe
| 611251 ||  || — || October 14, 2006 || Piszkesteto || K. Sárneczky, Z. Kuli ||  || align=right data-sort-value="0.60" | 600 m || 
|-id=252 bgcolor=#fefefe
| 611252 ||  || — || October 4, 2006 || Mount Lemmon || Mount Lemmon Survey ||  || align=right data-sort-value="0.79" | 790 m || 
|-id=253 bgcolor=#fefefe
| 611253 ||  || — || October 10, 2006 || Palomar || NEAT ||  || align=right data-sort-value="0.75" | 750 m || 
|-id=254 bgcolor=#fefefe
| 611254 ||  || — || September 19, 2006 || Kitt Peak || Spacewatch || NYS || align=right data-sort-value="0.49" | 490 m || 
|-id=255 bgcolor=#d6d6d6
| 611255 ||  || — || September 26, 2006 || Kitt Peak || Spacewatch ||  || align=right | 1.9 km || 
|-id=256 bgcolor=#fefefe
| 611256 ||  || — || September 25, 2006 || Mount Lemmon || Mount Lemmon Survey ||  || align=right data-sort-value="0.68" | 680 m || 
|-id=257 bgcolor=#fefefe
| 611257 ||  || — || September 30, 2006 || Mount Lemmon || Mount Lemmon Survey ||  || align=right data-sort-value="0.79" | 790 m || 
|-id=258 bgcolor=#d6d6d6
| 611258 ||  || — || September 28, 2006 || Catalina || CSS || BRA || align=right | 1.4 km || 
|-id=259 bgcolor=#fefefe
| 611259 ||  || — || October 4, 2006 || Mount Lemmon || Mount Lemmon Survey ||  || align=right data-sort-value="0.58" | 580 m || 
|-id=260 bgcolor=#E9E9E9
| 611260 ||  || — || September 30, 2006 || Mount Lemmon || Mount Lemmon Survey || EUN || align=right data-sort-value="0.93" | 930 m || 
|-id=261 bgcolor=#E9E9E9
| 611261 ||  || — || September 14, 2006 || Kitt Peak || Spacewatch ||  || align=right | 2.2 km || 
|-id=262 bgcolor=#E9E9E9
| 611262 ||  || — || October 1, 2006 || Apache Point || SDSS Collaboration ||  || align=right | 1.9 km || 
|-id=263 bgcolor=#E9E9E9
| 611263 ||  || — || August 28, 2006 || Apache Point || SDSS Collaboration ||  || align=right | 2.0 km || 
|-id=264 bgcolor=#d6d6d6
| 611264 ||  || — || October 12, 2006 || Apache Point || SDSS Collaboration || KOR || align=right data-sort-value="0.99" | 990 m || 
|-id=265 bgcolor=#E9E9E9
| 611265 ||  || — || October 3, 2006 || Mount Lemmon || Mount Lemmon Survey ||  || align=right | 1.5 km || 
|-id=266 bgcolor=#fefefe
| 611266 ||  || — || October 13, 2006 || Kitt Peak || Spacewatch ||  || align=right data-sort-value="0.57" | 570 m || 
|-id=267 bgcolor=#E9E9E9
| 611267 ||  || — || October 2, 2006 || Mount Lemmon || Mount Lemmon Survey ||  || align=right | 1.7 km || 
|-id=268 bgcolor=#fefefe
| 611268 ||  || — || October 2, 2006 || Mount Lemmon || Mount Lemmon Survey ||  || align=right data-sort-value="0.51" | 510 m || 
|-id=269 bgcolor=#fefefe
| 611269 ||  || — || October 3, 2006 || Mount Lemmon || Mount Lemmon Survey ||  || align=right data-sort-value="0.57" | 570 m || 
|-id=270 bgcolor=#fefefe
| 611270 ||  || — || October 2, 2006 || Mount Lemmon || Mount Lemmon Survey ||  || align=right data-sort-value="0.58" | 580 m || 
|-id=271 bgcolor=#E9E9E9
| 611271 ||  || — || October 21, 2011 || Mount Lemmon || Mount Lemmon Survey ||  || align=right | 2.3 km || 
|-id=272 bgcolor=#E9E9E9
| 611272 ||  || — || December 19, 2007 || Mount Lemmon || Mount Lemmon Survey ||  || align=right | 1.9 km || 
|-id=273 bgcolor=#d6d6d6
| 611273 ||  || — || October 2, 2006 || Mount Lemmon || Mount Lemmon Survey ||  || align=right | 2.0 km || 
|-id=274 bgcolor=#E9E9E9
| 611274 ||  || — || October 2, 2006 || Mount Lemmon || Mount Lemmon Survey ||  || align=right | 1.9 km || 
|-id=275 bgcolor=#d6d6d6
| 611275 ||  || — || December 23, 2012 || Haleakala || Pan-STARRS ||  || align=right | 1.9 km || 
|-id=276 bgcolor=#E9E9E9
| 611276 ||  || — || October 2, 2006 || Mount Lemmon || Mount Lemmon Survey ||  || align=right | 1.7 km || 
|-id=277 bgcolor=#E9E9E9
| 611277 ||  || — || October 2, 2006 || Mount Lemmon || Mount Lemmon Survey ||  || align=right | 2.3 km || 
|-id=278 bgcolor=#d6d6d6
| 611278 ||  || — || October 2, 2006 || Mount Lemmon || Mount Lemmon Survey ||  || align=right | 1.9 km || 
|-id=279 bgcolor=#fefefe
| 611279 ||  || — || October 17, 2006 || Piszkesteto || K. Sárneczky, Z. Kuli ||  || align=right data-sort-value="0.48" | 480 m || 
|-id=280 bgcolor=#E9E9E9
| 611280 ||  || — || October 2, 2006 || Mount Lemmon || Mount Lemmon Survey ||  || align=right | 2.0 km || 
|-id=281 bgcolor=#fefefe
| 611281 ||  || — || September 30, 2006 || Mount Lemmon || Mount Lemmon Survey ||  || align=right data-sort-value="0.70" | 700 m || 
|-id=282 bgcolor=#fefefe
| 611282 ||  || — || September 30, 2006 || Mount Lemmon || Mount Lemmon Survey ||  || align=right data-sort-value="0.67" | 670 m || 
|-id=283 bgcolor=#fefefe
| 611283 ||  || — || October 16, 2006 || Kitt Peak || Spacewatch ||  || align=right data-sort-value="0.69" | 690 m || 
|-id=284 bgcolor=#fefefe
| 611284 ||  || — || October 16, 2006 || Kitt Peak || Spacewatch ||  || align=right data-sort-value="0.54" | 540 m || 
|-id=285 bgcolor=#fefefe
| 611285 ||  || — || September 25, 2006 || Mount Lemmon || Mount Lemmon Survey || MAS || align=right data-sort-value="0.53" | 530 m || 
|-id=286 bgcolor=#E9E9E9
| 611286 ||  || — || October 16, 2006 || Kitt Peak || Spacewatch ||  || align=right | 2.3 km || 
|-id=287 bgcolor=#E9E9E9
| 611287 ||  || — || October 16, 2006 || Kitt Peak || Spacewatch ||  || align=right | 1.2 km || 
|-id=288 bgcolor=#E9E9E9
| 611288 ||  || — || September 26, 2006 || Mount Lemmon || Mount Lemmon Survey ||  || align=right | 1.7 km || 
|-id=289 bgcolor=#d6d6d6
| 611289 ||  || — || October 16, 2006 || Kitt Peak || Spacewatch ||  || align=right | 1.7 km || 
|-id=290 bgcolor=#E9E9E9
| 611290 ||  || — || October 16, 2006 || Kitt Peak || Spacewatch ||  || align=right | 2.2 km || 
|-id=291 bgcolor=#fefefe
| 611291 ||  || — || October 16, 2006 || Kitt Peak || Spacewatch ||  || align=right data-sort-value="0.76" | 760 m || 
|-id=292 bgcolor=#E9E9E9
| 611292 ||  || — || October 17, 2006 || Kitt Peak || Spacewatch ||  || align=right | 2.1 km || 
|-id=293 bgcolor=#fefefe
| 611293 ||  || — || September 30, 2006 || Kitt Peak || Spacewatch ||  || align=right data-sort-value="0.65" | 650 m || 
|-id=294 bgcolor=#E9E9E9
| 611294 ||  || — || October 18, 2006 || Kitt Peak || Spacewatch ||  || align=right | 1.5 km || 
|-id=295 bgcolor=#fefefe
| 611295 ||  || — || October 19, 2006 || Catalina || CSS ||  || align=right data-sort-value="0.82" | 820 m || 
|-id=296 bgcolor=#fefefe
| 611296 ||  || — || September 18, 2006 || Kitt Peak || Spacewatch ||  || align=right data-sort-value="0.52" | 520 m || 
|-id=297 bgcolor=#fefefe
| 611297 ||  || — || October 1, 2006 || Kitt Peak || Spacewatch ||  || align=right data-sort-value="0.46" | 460 m || 
|-id=298 bgcolor=#fefefe
| 611298 ||  || — || October 2, 2006 || Mount Lemmon || Mount Lemmon Survey ||  || align=right data-sort-value="0.54" | 540 m || 
|-id=299 bgcolor=#d6d6d6
| 611299 ||  || — || October 3, 2006 || Mount Lemmon || Mount Lemmon Survey ||  || align=right | 1.6 km || 
|-id=300 bgcolor=#d6d6d6
| 611300 ||  || — || September 30, 2006 || Mount Lemmon || Mount Lemmon Survey ||  || align=right | 1.9 km || 
|}

611301–611400 

|-bgcolor=#fefefe
| 611301 ||  || — || October 19, 2006 || Kitt Peak || Spacewatch ||  || align=right data-sort-value="0.75" | 750 m || 
|-id=302 bgcolor=#E9E9E9
| 611302 ||  || — || October 19, 2006 || Kitt Peak || Spacewatch ||  || align=right | 1.9 km || 
|-id=303 bgcolor=#E9E9E9
| 611303 ||  || — || October 19, 2006 || Kitt Peak || Spacewatch ||  || align=right | 1.7 km || 
|-id=304 bgcolor=#d6d6d6
| 611304 ||  || — || October 19, 2006 || Kitt Peak || Spacewatch ||  || align=right | 1.9 km || 
|-id=305 bgcolor=#E9E9E9
| 611305 ||  || — || October 2, 2006 || Mount Lemmon || Mount Lemmon Survey ||  || align=right | 1.8 km || 
|-id=306 bgcolor=#fefefe
| 611306 ||  || — || October 19, 2006 || Kitt Peak || Spacewatch ||  || align=right data-sort-value="0.57" | 570 m || 
|-id=307 bgcolor=#d6d6d6
| 611307 ||  || — || September 27, 2006 || Mount Lemmon || Mount Lemmon Survey ||  || align=right | 1.8 km || 
|-id=308 bgcolor=#fefefe
| 611308 ||  || — || October 19, 2006 || Mount Lemmon || Mount Lemmon Survey ||  || align=right data-sort-value="0.62" | 620 m || 
|-id=309 bgcolor=#d6d6d6
| 611309 ||  || — || April 13, 2004 || Kitt Peak || Spacewatch ||  || align=right | 2.5 km || 
|-id=310 bgcolor=#E9E9E9
| 611310 ||  || — || October 19, 2006 || Kitt Peak || Spacewatch ||  || align=right | 1.8 km || 
|-id=311 bgcolor=#E9E9E9
| 611311 ||  || — || October 20, 2006 || Kitt Peak || Spacewatch ||  || align=right | 2.3 km || 
|-id=312 bgcolor=#fefefe
| 611312 ||  || — || October 20, 2006 || Kitt Peak || Spacewatch ||  || align=right data-sort-value="0.80" | 800 m || 
|-id=313 bgcolor=#E9E9E9
| 611313 ||  || — || September 15, 2006 || Kitt Peak || Spacewatch ||  || align=right | 1.8 km || 
|-id=314 bgcolor=#fefefe
| 611314 ||  || — || August 27, 2006 || Kitt Peak || Spacewatch ||  || align=right data-sort-value="0.48" | 480 m || 
|-id=315 bgcolor=#E9E9E9
| 611315 ||  || — || September 20, 2006 || Kitt Peak || Spacewatch ||  || align=right | 2.0 km || 
|-id=316 bgcolor=#d6d6d6
| 611316 ||  || — || September 21, 2001 || Kitt Peak || Spacewatch ||  || align=right | 1.6 km || 
|-id=317 bgcolor=#fefefe
| 611317 ||  || — || October 21, 2006 || Mount Lemmon || Mount Lemmon Survey ||  || align=right data-sort-value="0.73" | 730 m || 
|-id=318 bgcolor=#E9E9E9
| 611318 ||  || — || October 3, 2006 || Mount Lemmon || Mount Lemmon Survey ||  || align=right | 1.8 km || 
|-id=319 bgcolor=#E9E9E9
| 611319 ||  || — || March 29, 2004 || Kitt Peak || Spacewatch ||  || align=right | 2.2 km || 
|-id=320 bgcolor=#d6d6d6
| 611320 ||  || — || September 25, 2006 || Mount Lemmon || Mount Lemmon Survey ||  || align=right | 1.7 km || 
|-id=321 bgcolor=#E9E9E9
| 611321 ||  || — || October 16, 2006 || Catalina || CSS ||  || align=right | 2.6 km || 
|-id=322 bgcolor=#fefefe
| 611322 ||  || — || October 11, 2006 || Palomar || NEAT ||  || align=right data-sort-value="0.89" | 890 m || 
|-id=323 bgcolor=#d6d6d6
| 611323 ||  || — || October 20, 2006 || Kitt Peak || Spacewatch ||  || align=right | 1.8 km || 
|-id=324 bgcolor=#fefefe
| 611324 ||  || — || October 20, 2006 || Kitt Peak || Spacewatch ||  || align=right data-sort-value="0.50" | 500 m || 
|-id=325 bgcolor=#fefefe
| 611325 ||  || — || October 21, 2006 || Mount Lemmon || Mount Lemmon Survey ||  || align=right data-sort-value="0.77" | 770 m || 
|-id=326 bgcolor=#E9E9E9
| 611326 ||  || — || October 23, 2006 || Mauna Kea || Mauna Kea Obs. ||  || align=right | 1.5 km || 
|-id=327 bgcolor=#fefefe
| 611327 ||  || — || October 11, 2006 || Palomar || NEAT ||  || align=right data-sort-value="0.77" | 770 m || 
|-id=328 bgcolor=#d6d6d6
| 611328 ||  || — || September 27, 2006 || Mount Lemmon || Mount Lemmon Survey ||  || align=right | 1.7 km || 
|-id=329 bgcolor=#fefefe
| 611329 ||  || — || September 17, 2006 || Kitt Peak || Spacewatch ||  || align=right data-sort-value="0.67" | 670 m || 
|-id=330 bgcolor=#d6d6d6
| 611330 ||  || — || April 25, 2004 || Kitt Peak || Spacewatch ||  || align=right | 2.1 km || 
|-id=331 bgcolor=#d6d6d6
| 611331 ||  || — || October 27, 2006 || Mount Lemmon || Mount Lemmon Survey ||  || align=right | 1.7 km || 
|-id=332 bgcolor=#d6d6d6
| 611332 ||  || — || October 27, 2006 || Mount Lemmon || Mount Lemmon Survey ||  || align=right | 1.8 km || 
|-id=333 bgcolor=#fefefe
| 611333 ||  || — || October 27, 2006 || Mount Lemmon || Mount Lemmon Survey ||  || align=right data-sort-value="0.60" | 600 m || 
|-id=334 bgcolor=#fefefe
| 611334 ||  || — || October 20, 2006 || Kitt Peak || Spacewatch ||  || align=right data-sort-value="0.70" | 700 m || 
|-id=335 bgcolor=#d6d6d6
| 611335 ||  || — || October 20, 2006 || Kitt Peak || Spacewatch || KOR || align=right | 1.1 km || 
|-id=336 bgcolor=#d6d6d6
| 611336 ||  || — || October 27, 2006 || Mount Lemmon || Mount Lemmon Survey ||  || align=right | 1.6 km || 
|-id=337 bgcolor=#fefefe
| 611337 ||  || — || October 27, 2006 || Mount Lemmon || Mount Lemmon Survey ||  || align=right data-sort-value="0.74" | 740 m || 
|-id=338 bgcolor=#fefefe
| 611338 ||  || — || October 21, 2006 || Kitt Peak || Spacewatch || H || align=right data-sort-value="0.42" | 420 m || 
|-id=339 bgcolor=#fefefe
| 611339 ||  || — || September 30, 2006 || Kitt Peak || Spacewatch ||  || align=right data-sort-value="0.80" | 800 m || 
|-id=340 bgcolor=#E9E9E9
| 611340 ||  || — || October 20, 2006 || Kitt Peak || Spacewatch ||  || align=right | 1.6 km || 
|-id=341 bgcolor=#d6d6d6
| 611341 ||  || — || October 19, 2006 || Kitt Peak || Spacewatch ||  || align=right | 2.1 km || 
|-id=342 bgcolor=#d6d6d6
| 611342 ||  || — || October 28, 2006 || Mount Lemmon || Mount Lemmon Survey ||  || align=right | 2.3 km || 
|-id=343 bgcolor=#d6d6d6
| 611343 ||  || — || October 29, 2006 || Mount Lemmon || Mount Lemmon Survey ||  || align=right | 1.8 km || 
|-id=344 bgcolor=#d6d6d6
| 611344 ||  || — || September 25, 2006 || Mount Lemmon || Mount Lemmon Survey ||  || align=right | 1.7 km || 
|-id=345 bgcolor=#E9E9E9
| 611345 ||  || — || October 19, 2006 || Kitt Peak || L. H. Wasserman ||  || align=right | 1.3 km || 
|-id=346 bgcolor=#E9E9E9
| 611346 ||  || — || October 19, 2006 || Kitt Peak || L. H. Wasserman ||  || align=right | 1.8 km || 
|-id=347 bgcolor=#E9E9E9
| 611347 ||  || — || October 19, 2006 || Kitt Peak || L. H. Wasserman ||  || align=right | 1.6 km || 
|-id=348 bgcolor=#E9E9E9
| 611348 ||  || — || September 25, 2006 || Mount Lemmon || Mount Lemmon Survey ||  || align=right | 1.9 km || 
|-id=349 bgcolor=#fefefe
| 611349 ||  || — || November 18, 2006 || Kitt Peak || Spacewatch || V || align=right data-sort-value="0.64" | 640 m || 
|-id=350 bgcolor=#fefefe
| 611350 ||  || — || November 16, 2006 || Kitt Peak || Spacewatch ||  || align=right data-sort-value="0.53" | 530 m || 
|-id=351 bgcolor=#d6d6d6
| 611351 ||  || — || September 25, 2006 || Mount Lemmon || Mount Lemmon Survey ||  || align=right | 1.8 km || 
|-id=352 bgcolor=#E9E9E9
| 611352 ||  || — || October 21, 2006 || Mount Lemmon || Mount Lemmon Survey ||  || align=right | 1.7 km || 
|-id=353 bgcolor=#d6d6d6
| 611353 ||  || — || October 17, 2006 || Apache Point || SDSS Collaboration || BRA || align=right | 1.3 km || 
|-id=354 bgcolor=#d6d6d6
| 611354 ||  || — || December 7, 2001 || Kitt Peak || Spacewatch ||  || align=right | 2.0 km || 
|-id=355 bgcolor=#fefefe
| 611355 ||  || — || November 12, 2006 || Mount Lemmon || Mount Lemmon Survey ||  || align=right data-sort-value="0.60" | 600 m || 
|-id=356 bgcolor=#fefefe
| 611356 ||  || — || November 1, 2006 || Kitt Peak || Spacewatch ||  || align=right data-sort-value="0.65" | 650 m || 
|-id=357 bgcolor=#d6d6d6
| 611357 ||  || — || November 12, 2006 || Mount Lemmon || Mount Lemmon Survey || KOR || align=right data-sort-value="0.89" | 890 m || 
|-id=358 bgcolor=#d6d6d6
| 611358 ||  || — || October 26, 2006 || Mauna Kea || Mauna Kea Obs. ||  || align=right | 1.7 km || 
|-id=359 bgcolor=#fefefe
| 611359 ||  || — || October 21, 2006 || Kitt Peak || Spacewatch ||  || align=right | 1.0 km || 
|-id=360 bgcolor=#fefefe
| 611360 ||  || — || October 21, 2006 || Catalina || CSS ||  || align=right data-sort-value="0.91" | 910 m || 
|-id=361 bgcolor=#fefefe
| 611361 ||  || — || October 18, 2006 || Kitt Peak || Spacewatch ||  || align=right data-sort-value="0.50" | 500 m || 
|-id=362 bgcolor=#fefefe
| 611362 ||  || — || March 14, 2012 || Mount Lemmon || Mount Lemmon Survey ||  || align=right data-sort-value="0.88" | 880 m || 
|-id=363 bgcolor=#fefefe
| 611363 ||  || — || September 10, 2013 || Haleakala || Pan-STARRS ||  || align=right data-sort-value="0.64" | 640 m || 
|-id=364 bgcolor=#fefefe
| 611364 ||  || — || October 21, 2006 || Kitt Peak || Spacewatch ||  || align=right data-sort-value="0.55" | 550 m || 
|-id=365 bgcolor=#fefefe
| 611365 ||  || — || October 21, 2006 || Kitt Peak || Spacewatch ||  || align=right data-sort-value="0.64" | 640 m || 
|-id=366 bgcolor=#fefefe
| 611366 ||  || — || October 22, 2006 || Kitt Peak || Spacewatch ||  || align=right data-sort-value="0.52" | 520 m || 
|-id=367 bgcolor=#fefefe
| 611367 ||  || — || September 20, 2006 || Kitt Peak || Spacewatch ||  || align=right data-sort-value="0.62" | 620 m || 
|-id=368 bgcolor=#fefefe
| 611368 ||  || — || October 21, 2006 || Kitt Peak || Spacewatch ||  || align=right data-sort-value="0.70" | 700 m || 
|-id=369 bgcolor=#E9E9E9
| 611369 ||  || — || August 10, 2010 || Kitt Peak || Spacewatch ||  || align=right | 2.2 km || 
|-id=370 bgcolor=#E9E9E9
| 611370 ||  || — || January 17, 2013 || Haleakala || Pan-STARRS ||  || align=right | 1.8 km || 
|-id=371 bgcolor=#fefefe
| 611371 ||  || — || October 18, 2006 || Kitt Peak || Spacewatch ||  || align=right data-sort-value="0.62" | 620 m || 
|-id=372 bgcolor=#fefefe
| 611372 ||  || — || October 20, 2006 || Mount Lemmon || Mount Lemmon Survey ||  || align=right data-sort-value="0.63" | 630 m || 
|-id=373 bgcolor=#d6d6d6
| 611373 ||  || — || January 2, 2008 || Bergisch Gladbach || W. Bickel ||  || align=right | 1.7 km || 
|-id=374 bgcolor=#E9E9E9
| 611374 ||  || — || June 22, 2010 || Kitt Peak || Spacewatch ||  || align=right | 2.0 km || 
|-id=375 bgcolor=#fefefe
| 611375 ||  || — || December 10, 2010 || Kitt Peak || Spacewatch ||  || align=right data-sort-value="0.52" | 520 m || 
|-id=376 bgcolor=#d6d6d6
| 611376 ||  || — || October 20, 2011 || Mount Lemmon || Mount Lemmon Survey ||  || align=right | 1.8 km || 
|-id=377 bgcolor=#fefefe
| 611377 ||  || — || March 21, 2012 || Mount Lemmon || Mount Lemmon Survey ||  || align=right data-sort-value="0.66" | 660 m || 
|-id=378 bgcolor=#E9E9E9
| 611378 ||  || — || October 8, 2015 || Mount Lemmon || Mount Lemmon Survey ||  || align=right | 1.5 km || 
|-id=379 bgcolor=#fefefe
| 611379 ||  || — || October 3, 2006 || Mount Lemmon || Mount Lemmon Survey ||  || align=right data-sort-value="0.56" | 560 m || 
|-id=380 bgcolor=#E9E9E9
| 611380 ||  || — || June 26, 2015 || Haleakala || Pan-STARRS ||  || align=right | 1.5 km || 
|-id=381 bgcolor=#fefefe
| 611381 ||  || — || October 30, 2017 || Haleakala || Pan-STARRS ||  || align=right data-sort-value="0.57" | 570 m || 
|-id=382 bgcolor=#E9E9E9
| 611382 ||  || — || February 19, 2013 || Kitt Peak || Spacewatch ||  || align=right | 1.7 km || 
|-id=383 bgcolor=#d6d6d6
| 611383 ||  || — || October 23, 2006 || Kitt Peak || Spacewatch ||  || align=right | 1.8 km || 
|-id=384 bgcolor=#fefefe
| 611384 ||  || — || February 28, 2012 || Haleakala || Pan-STARRS ||  || align=right data-sort-value="0.61" | 610 m || 
|-id=385 bgcolor=#d6d6d6
| 611385 ||  || — || October 23, 2006 || Mount Lemmon || Mount Lemmon Survey ||  || align=right | 2.3 km || 
|-id=386 bgcolor=#d6d6d6
| 611386 ||  || — || October 18, 2006 || Kitt Peak || Spacewatch ||  || align=right | 1.8 km || 
|-id=387 bgcolor=#fefefe
| 611387 ||  || — || October 21, 2006 || Mount Lemmon || Mount Lemmon Survey ||  || align=right data-sort-value="0.76" | 760 m || 
|-id=388 bgcolor=#d6d6d6
| 611388 ||  || — || October 23, 2006 || Kitt Peak || Spacewatch ||  || align=right | 2.1 km || 
|-id=389 bgcolor=#d6d6d6
| 611389 ||  || — || October 16, 2006 || Kitt Peak || Spacewatch ||  || align=right | 1.6 km || 
|-id=390 bgcolor=#d6d6d6
| 611390 ||  || — || October 21, 2006 || Mount Lemmon || Mount Lemmon Survey ||  || align=right | 1.5 km || 
|-id=391 bgcolor=#E9E9E9
| 611391 ||  || — || October 21, 2006 || Kitt Peak || Spacewatch ||  || align=right | 2.0 km || 
|-id=392 bgcolor=#d6d6d6
| 611392 ||  || — || October 31, 2006 || Mount Lemmon || Mount Lemmon Survey ||  || align=right | 2.1 km || 
|-id=393 bgcolor=#E9E9E9
| 611393 ||  || — || October 21, 2006 || Mount Lemmon || Mount Lemmon Survey ||  || align=right | 1.8 km || 
|-id=394 bgcolor=#d6d6d6
| 611394 ||  || — || October 31, 2006 || Mount Lemmon || Mount Lemmon Survey ||  || align=right | 2.2 km || 
|-id=395 bgcolor=#d6d6d6
| 611395 ||  || — || October 31, 2006 || Mount Lemmon || Mount Lemmon Survey ||  || align=right | 1.6 km || 
|-id=396 bgcolor=#fefefe
| 611396 ||  || — || November 1, 2006 || Mount Lemmon || Mount Lemmon Survey ||  || align=right data-sort-value="0.89" | 890 m || 
|-id=397 bgcolor=#E9E9E9
| 611397 ||  || — || September 26, 2006 || Mount Lemmon || Mount Lemmon Survey ||  || align=right | 1.6 km || 
|-id=398 bgcolor=#fefefe
| 611398 ||  || — || October 17, 2006 || Mount Lemmon || Mount Lemmon Survey ||  || align=right data-sort-value="0.69" | 690 m || 
|-id=399 bgcolor=#fefefe
| 611399 ||  || — || November 11, 2006 || Mount Lemmon || Mount Lemmon Survey ||  || align=right data-sort-value="0.61" | 610 m || 
|-id=400 bgcolor=#fefefe
| 611400 ||  || — || September 27, 2006 || Mount Lemmon || Mount Lemmon Survey || NYS || align=right data-sort-value="0.53" | 530 m || 
|}

611401–611500 

|-bgcolor=#fefefe
| 611401 ||  || — || October 21, 2006 || Kitt Peak || Spacewatch || MAS || align=right data-sort-value="0.61" | 610 m || 
|-id=402 bgcolor=#d6d6d6
| 611402 ||  || — || October 31, 2006 || Mount Lemmon || Mount Lemmon Survey ||  || align=right | 1.9 km || 
|-id=403 bgcolor=#d6d6d6
| 611403 ||  || — || October 27, 2006 || Kitt Peak || Spacewatch ||  || align=right | 2.3 km || 
|-id=404 bgcolor=#fefefe
| 611404 ||  || — || September 27, 2006 || Mount Lemmon || Mount Lemmon Survey ||  || align=right data-sort-value="0.84" | 840 m || 
|-id=405 bgcolor=#d6d6d6
| 611405 ||  || — || November 10, 2006 || Kitt Peak || Spacewatch ||  || align=right | 2.2 km || 
|-id=406 bgcolor=#d6d6d6
| 611406 ||  || — || November 10, 2006 || Kitt Peak || Spacewatch ||  || align=right | 1.7 km || 
|-id=407 bgcolor=#d6d6d6
| 611407 ||  || — || November 11, 2006 || Mount Lemmon || Mount Lemmon Survey ||  || align=right | 2.1 km || 
|-id=408 bgcolor=#fefefe
| 611408 ||  || — || October 19, 2006 || Mount Lemmon || Mount Lemmon Survey ||  || align=right data-sort-value="0.54" | 540 m || 
|-id=409 bgcolor=#fefefe
| 611409 ||  || — || November 11, 2006 || Kitt Peak || Spacewatch || MAS || align=right data-sort-value="0.45" | 450 m || 
|-id=410 bgcolor=#d6d6d6
| 611410 ||  || — || November 11, 2006 || Kitt Peak || Spacewatch ||  || align=right | 2.6 km || 
|-id=411 bgcolor=#d6d6d6
| 611411 ||  || — || November 11, 2006 || Kitt Peak || Spacewatch ||  || align=right | 2.2 km || 
|-id=412 bgcolor=#E9E9E9
| 611412 ||  || — || September 28, 2001 || Palomar || NEAT ||  || align=right | 2.0 km || 
|-id=413 bgcolor=#d6d6d6
| 611413 ||  || — || October 22, 2006 || Mount Lemmon || Mount Lemmon Survey ||  || align=right | 1.9 km || 
|-id=414 bgcolor=#fefefe
| 611414 ||  || — || October 2, 2006 || Mount Lemmon || Mount Lemmon Survey ||  || align=right data-sort-value="0.96" | 960 m || 
|-id=415 bgcolor=#d6d6d6
| 611415 ||  || — || October 19, 2006 || Kitt Peak || Spacewatch ||  || align=right | 1.9 km || 
|-id=416 bgcolor=#fefefe
| 611416 ||  || — || February 2, 2000 || Kitt Peak || Spacewatch ||  || align=right data-sort-value="0.79" | 790 m || 
|-id=417 bgcolor=#d6d6d6
| 611417 ||  || — || October 28, 2006 || Mount Lemmon || Mount Lemmon Survey ||  || align=right | 2.4 km || 
|-id=418 bgcolor=#fefefe
| 611418 ||  || — || November 14, 2006 || Kitt Peak || Spacewatch ||  || align=right data-sort-value="0.71" | 710 m || 
|-id=419 bgcolor=#E9E9E9
| 611419 ||  || — || November 15, 2006 || Kitt Peak || Spacewatch ||  || align=right | 1.8 km || 
|-id=420 bgcolor=#E9E9E9
| 611420 ||  || — || November 15, 2006 || Kitt Peak || Spacewatch ||  || align=right | 2.3 km || 
|-id=421 bgcolor=#d6d6d6
| 611421 ||  || — || November 15, 2006 || Kitt Peak || Spacewatch ||  || align=right | 1.7 km || 
|-id=422 bgcolor=#d6d6d6
| 611422 ||  || — || November 15, 2006 || Kitt Peak || Spacewatch ||  || align=right | 1.6 km || 
|-id=423 bgcolor=#d6d6d6
| 611423 ||  || — || November 15, 2006 || Kitt Peak || Spacewatch ||  || align=right | 1.7 km || 
|-id=424 bgcolor=#fefefe
| 611424 ||  || — || November 12, 2006 || Mount Lemmon || Mount Lemmon Survey ||  || align=right data-sort-value="0.48" | 480 m || 
|-id=425 bgcolor=#fefefe
| 611425 ||  || — || October 31, 2006 || Kitt Peak || Spacewatch ||  || align=right data-sort-value="0.98" | 980 m || 
|-id=426 bgcolor=#fefefe
| 611426 ||  || — || November 11, 2006 || Kitt Peak || Spacewatch ||  || align=right data-sort-value="0.52" | 520 m || 
|-id=427 bgcolor=#fefefe
| 611427 ||  || — || May 29, 2012 || Mount Lemmon || Mount Lemmon Survey ||  || align=right data-sort-value="0.62" | 620 m || 
|-id=428 bgcolor=#fefefe
| 611428 ||  || — || July 28, 2009 || Kitt Peak || Spacewatch ||  || align=right data-sort-value="0.85" | 850 m || 
|-id=429 bgcolor=#fefefe
| 611429 ||  || — || March 4, 2016 || Haleakala || Pan-STARRS ||  || align=right data-sort-value="0.64" | 640 m || 
|-id=430 bgcolor=#d6d6d6
| 611430 ||  || — || November 15, 2006 || Kitt Peak || Spacewatch ||  || align=right | 1.8 km || 
|-id=431 bgcolor=#d6d6d6
| 611431 ||  || — || November 15, 2006 || Mount Lemmon || Mount Lemmon Survey ||  || align=right | 2.1 km || 
|-id=432 bgcolor=#fefefe
| 611432 ||  || — || November 11, 2006 || Mount Lemmon || Mount Lemmon Survey ||  || align=right data-sort-value="0.65" | 650 m || 
|-id=433 bgcolor=#d6d6d6
| 611433 ||  || — || November 2, 2006 || Mount Lemmon || Mount Lemmon Survey ||  || align=right | 2.3 km || 
|-id=434 bgcolor=#d6d6d6
| 611434 ||  || — || November 14, 2006 || Kitt Peak || Spacewatch ||  || align=right | 2.0 km || 
|-id=435 bgcolor=#fefefe
| 611435 ||  || — || October 23, 2006 || Mount Lemmon || Mount Lemmon Survey ||  || align=right data-sort-value="0.58" | 580 m || 
|-id=436 bgcolor=#d6d6d6
| 611436 ||  || — || November 16, 2006 || Kitt Peak || Spacewatch ||  || align=right | 2.0 km || 
|-id=437 bgcolor=#d6d6d6
| 611437 ||  || — || November 17, 2006 || Mount Lemmon || Mount Lemmon Survey ||  || align=right | 2.4 km || 
|-id=438 bgcolor=#fefefe
| 611438 ||  || — || November 17, 2006 || Mount Lemmon || Mount Lemmon Survey ||  || align=right data-sort-value="0.56" | 560 m || 
|-id=439 bgcolor=#E9E9E9
| 611439 ||  || — || October 27, 2006 || Mount Lemmon || Mount Lemmon Survey ||  || align=right data-sort-value="0.94" | 940 m || 
|-id=440 bgcolor=#d6d6d6
| 611440 ||  || — || October 21, 2006 || Kitt Peak || Spacewatch ||  || align=right | 2.1 km || 
|-id=441 bgcolor=#d6d6d6
| 611441 ||  || — || November 16, 2006 || Mount Lemmon || Mount Lemmon Survey ||  || align=right | 2.0 km || 
|-id=442 bgcolor=#E9E9E9
| 611442 ||  || — || October 3, 2006 || Mount Lemmon || Mount Lemmon Survey ||  || align=right | 2.2 km || 
|-id=443 bgcolor=#fefefe
| 611443 ||  || — || November 16, 2006 || Catalina || CSS ||  || align=right data-sort-value="0.94" | 940 m || 
|-id=444 bgcolor=#fefefe
| 611444 ||  || — || November 16, 2006 || Kitt Peak || Spacewatch ||  || align=right data-sort-value="0.54" | 540 m || 
|-id=445 bgcolor=#d6d6d6
| 611445 ||  || — || August 6, 2005 || Palomar || NEAT ||  || align=right | 2.8 km || 
|-id=446 bgcolor=#fefefe
| 611446 ||  || — || November 17, 2006 || Mount Lemmon || Mount Lemmon Survey ||  || align=right data-sort-value="0.80" | 800 m || 
|-id=447 bgcolor=#d6d6d6
| 611447 ||  || — || November 17, 2006 || Mount Lemmon || Mount Lemmon Survey ||  || align=right | 1.9 km || 
|-id=448 bgcolor=#fefefe
| 611448 ||  || — || September 25, 2006 || Kitt Peak || Spacewatch ||  || align=right data-sort-value="0.59" | 590 m || 
|-id=449 bgcolor=#E9E9E9
| 611449 ||  || — || October 31, 2006 || Mount Lemmon || Mount Lemmon Survey ||  || align=right | 1.9 km || 
|-id=450 bgcolor=#d6d6d6
| 611450 ||  || — || September 27, 2006 || Mount Lemmon || Mount Lemmon Survey ||  || align=right | 2.6 km || 
|-id=451 bgcolor=#d6d6d6
| 611451 ||  || — || November 18, 2006 || Kitt Peak || Spacewatch ||  || align=right | 2.1 km || 
|-id=452 bgcolor=#d6d6d6
| 611452 ||  || — || November 18, 2006 || Mount Lemmon || Mount Lemmon Survey ||  || align=right | 2.5 km || 
|-id=453 bgcolor=#d6d6d6
| 611453 ||  || — || October 21, 2006 || Mount Lemmon || Mount Lemmon Survey ||  || align=right | 2.6 km || 
|-id=454 bgcolor=#fefefe
| 611454 ||  || — || November 18, 2006 || Kitt Peak || Spacewatch ||  || align=right data-sort-value="0.58" | 580 m || 
|-id=455 bgcolor=#fefefe
| 611455 ||  || — || November 18, 2006 || Kitt Peak || Spacewatch || NYS || align=right data-sort-value="0.61" | 610 m || 
|-id=456 bgcolor=#fefefe
| 611456 ||  || — || November 19, 2006 || Kitt Peak || Spacewatch ||  || align=right data-sort-value="0.50" | 500 m || 
|-id=457 bgcolor=#d6d6d6
| 611457 ||  || — || October 19, 2006 || Mount Lemmon || Mount Lemmon Survey ||  || align=right | 1.9 km || 
|-id=458 bgcolor=#d6d6d6
| 611458 ||  || — || November 19, 2006 || Kitt Peak || Spacewatch ||  || align=right | 2.0 km || 
|-id=459 bgcolor=#fefefe
| 611459 ||  || — || November 19, 2006 || Kitt Peak || Spacewatch ||  || align=right data-sort-value="0.52" | 520 m || 
|-id=460 bgcolor=#d6d6d6
| 611460 ||  || — || November 19, 2006 || Kitt Peak || Spacewatch ||  || align=right | 2.3 km || 
|-id=461 bgcolor=#d6d6d6
| 611461 ||  || — || November 19, 2006 || Kitt Peak || Spacewatch ||  || align=right | 2.4 km || 
|-id=462 bgcolor=#d6d6d6
| 611462 ||  || — || November 19, 2006 || Kitt Peak || Spacewatch ||  || align=right | 1.8 km || 
|-id=463 bgcolor=#d6d6d6
| 611463 ||  || — || October 4, 2006 || Mount Lemmon || Mount Lemmon Survey ||  || align=right | 2.3 km || 
|-id=464 bgcolor=#d6d6d6
| 611464 ||  || — || November 21, 2006 || Mount Lemmon || Mount Lemmon Survey ||  || align=right | 3.4 km || 
|-id=465 bgcolor=#fefefe
| 611465 ||  || — || November 22, 2006 || Mount Lemmon || Mount Lemmon Survey ||  || align=right data-sort-value="0.66" | 660 m || 
|-id=466 bgcolor=#fefefe
| 611466 ||  || — || October 4, 2006 || Mount Lemmon || Mount Lemmon Survey ||  || align=right data-sort-value="0.82" | 820 m || 
|-id=467 bgcolor=#d6d6d6
| 611467 ||  || — || November 19, 2006 || Kitt Peak || Spacewatch ||  || align=right | 2.1 km || 
|-id=468 bgcolor=#E9E9E9
| 611468 ||  || — || November 20, 2006 || Kitt Peak || Spacewatch ||  || align=right | 2.8 km || 
|-id=469 bgcolor=#d6d6d6
| 611469 ||  || — || November 20, 2006 || Kitt Peak || Spacewatch ||  || align=right | 2.2 km || 
|-id=470 bgcolor=#d6d6d6
| 611470 ||  || — || November 20, 2006 || Kitt Peak || Spacewatch ||  || align=right | 2.2 km || 
|-id=471 bgcolor=#d6d6d6
| 611471 ||  || — || November 20, 2006 || Kitt Peak || Spacewatch ||  || align=right | 2.0 km || 
|-id=472 bgcolor=#d6d6d6
| 611472 ||  || — || November 22, 2006 || Kitt Peak || Spacewatch ||  || align=right | 2.0 km || 
|-id=473 bgcolor=#d6d6d6
| 611473 ||  || — || November 22, 2006 || Mount Lemmon || Mount Lemmon Survey ||  || align=right | 2.6 km || 
|-id=474 bgcolor=#E9E9E9
| 611474 ||  || — || January 24, 2003 || La Silla || A. Boattini, O. R. Hainaut ||  || align=right | 2.7 km || 
|-id=475 bgcolor=#fefefe
| 611475 ||  || — || October 15, 2002 || Palomar || NEAT ||  || align=right data-sort-value="0.84" | 840 m || 
|-id=476 bgcolor=#d6d6d6
| 611476 ||  || — || November 23, 2006 || Kitt Peak || Spacewatch ||  || align=right | 1.9 km || 
|-id=477 bgcolor=#E9E9E9
| 611477 ||  || — || November 23, 2006 || Kitt Peak || Spacewatch ||  || align=right | 1.6 km || 
|-id=478 bgcolor=#d6d6d6
| 611478 ||  || — || November 23, 2006 || Kitt Peak || Spacewatch ||  || align=right | 1.9 km || 
|-id=479 bgcolor=#d6d6d6
| 611479 ||  || — || November 23, 2006 || Kitt Peak || Spacewatch ||  || align=right | 2.2 km || 
|-id=480 bgcolor=#fefefe
| 611480 ||  || — || November 23, 2006 || Kitt Peak || Spacewatch ||  || align=right data-sort-value="0.62" | 620 m || 
|-id=481 bgcolor=#fefefe
| 611481 ||  || — || November 23, 2006 || Kitt Peak || Spacewatch ||  || align=right data-sort-value="0.79" | 790 m || 
|-id=482 bgcolor=#fefefe
| 611482 ||  || — || February 8, 2000 || Kitt Peak || Spacewatch ||  || align=right data-sort-value="0.49" | 490 m || 
|-id=483 bgcolor=#fefefe
| 611483 ||  || — || September 27, 2006 || Mount Lemmon || Mount Lemmon Survey ||  || align=right data-sort-value="0.69" | 690 m || 
|-id=484 bgcolor=#fefefe
| 611484 ||  || — || May 20, 2005 || Mount Lemmon || Mount Lemmon Survey ||  || align=right data-sort-value="0.77" | 770 m || 
|-id=485 bgcolor=#d6d6d6
| 611485 ||  || — || October 31, 2006 || Mount Lemmon || Mount Lemmon Survey ||  || align=right | 1.8 km || 
|-id=486 bgcolor=#fefefe
| 611486 ||  || — || November 24, 2006 || Kitt Peak || J. W. Parker || CLA || align=right | 1.7 km || 
|-id=487 bgcolor=#d6d6d6
| 611487 ||  || — || November 19, 2006 || Kitt Peak || Spacewatch ||  || align=right | 1.9 km || 
|-id=488 bgcolor=#d6d6d6
| 611488 ||  || — || March 10, 2003 || Kitt Peak || Spacewatch ||  || align=right | 2.2 km || 
|-id=489 bgcolor=#fefefe
| 611489 ||  || — || November 17, 2006 || Kitt Peak || Spacewatch ||  || align=right data-sort-value="0.89" | 890 m || 
|-id=490 bgcolor=#fefefe
| 611490 ||  || — || November 18, 2006 || Mount Lemmon || Mount Lemmon Survey ||  || align=right data-sort-value="0.67" | 670 m || 
|-id=491 bgcolor=#d6d6d6
| 611491 ||  || — || September 11, 2015 || Haleakala || Pan-STARRS ||  || align=right | 2.1 km || 
|-id=492 bgcolor=#fefefe
| 611492 ||  || — || November 19, 2006 || Kitt Peak || Spacewatch ||  || align=right data-sort-value="0.49" | 490 m || 
|-id=493 bgcolor=#fefefe
| 611493 ||  || — || March 1, 2008 || Kitt Peak || Spacewatch ||  || align=right data-sort-value="0.69" | 690 m || 
|-id=494 bgcolor=#d6d6d6
| 611494 ||  || — || May 18, 2014 || Mount Graham || R. P. Boyle ||  || align=right | 1.9 km || 
|-id=495 bgcolor=#d6d6d6
| 611495 ||  || — || November 20, 2006 || Kitt Peak || Spacewatch ||  || align=right | 2.4 km || 
|-id=496 bgcolor=#fefefe
| 611496 ||  || — || July 14, 2013 || Haleakala || Pan-STARRS ||  || align=right data-sort-value="0.66" | 660 m || 
|-id=497 bgcolor=#fefefe
| 611497 ||  || — || January 23, 2015 || Haleakala || Pan-STARRS ||  || align=right data-sort-value="0.65" | 650 m || 
|-id=498 bgcolor=#fefefe
| 611498 ||  || — || October 23, 2013 || Mount Lemmon || Mount Lemmon Survey ||  || align=right data-sort-value="0.73" | 730 m || 
|-id=499 bgcolor=#E9E9E9
| 611499 ||  || — || February 3, 2008 || Mount Lemmon || Mount Lemmon Survey ||  || align=right | 2.1 km || 
|-id=500 bgcolor=#E9E9E9
| 611500 ||  || — || September 15, 2010 || Mount Lemmon || Mount Lemmon Survey ||  || align=right data-sort-value="0.95" | 950 m || 
|}

611501–611600 

|-bgcolor=#d6d6d6
| 611501 ||  || — || November 10, 2016 || Haleakala || Pan-STARRS ||  || align=right | 2.4 km || 
|-id=502 bgcolor=#E9E9E9
| 611502 ||  || — || July 1, 2014 || Haleakala || Pan-STARRS ||  || align=right | 1.5 km || 
|-id=503 bgcolor=#fefefe
| 611503 ||  || — || November 16, 2006 || Kitt Peak || Spacewatch ||  || align=right data-sort-value="0.46" | 460 m || 
|-id=504 bgcolor=#d6d6d6
| 611504 ||  || — || May 7, 2014 || Haleakala || Pan-STARRS ||  || align=right | 2.1 km || 
|-id=505 bgcolor=#d6d6d6
| 611505 ||  || — || February 13, 2013 || ESA OGS || ESA OGS ||  || align=right | 2.2 km || 
|-id=506 bgcolor=#E9E9E9
| 611506 ||  || — || November 17, 2006 || Mount Lemmon || Mount Lemmon Survey ||  || align=right | 1.5 km || 
|-id=507 bgcolor=#fefefe
| 611507 ||  || — || November 19, 2006 || Kitt Peak || Spacewatch ||  || align=right data-sort-value="0.51" | 510 m || 
|-id=508 bgcolor=#fefefe
| 611508 ||  || — || November 19, 2006 || Kitt Peak || Spacewatch ||  || align=right data-sort-value="0.51" | 510 m || 
|-id=509 bgcolor=#fefefe
| 611509 ||  || — || November 17, 2006 || Kitt Peak || Spacewatch ||  || align=right data-sort-value="0.96" | 960 m || 
|-id=510 bgcolor=#d6d6d6
| 611510 ||  || — || November 16, 2006 || Mount Lemmon || Mount Lemmon Survey ||  || align=right | 3.2 km || 
|-id=511 bgcolor=#d6d6d6
| 611511 ||  || — || November 18, 2006 || Mount Lemmon || Mount Lemmon Survey ||  || align=right | 3.4 km || 
|-id=512 bgcolor=#d6d6d6
| 611512 ||  || — || November 18, 2006 || Mount Lemmon || Mount Lemmon Survey ||  || align=right | 2.4 km || 
|-id=513 bgcolor=#d6d6d6
| 611513 ||  || — || November 16, 2006 || Mount Lemmon || Mount Lemmon Survey ||  || align=right | 2.1 km || 
|-id=514 bgcolor=#d6d6d6
| 611514 ||  || — || November 16, 2006 || Kitt Peak || Spacewatch ||  || align=right | 1.9 km || 
|-id=515 bgcolor=#d6d6d6
| 611515 ||  || — || November 22, 2006 || Kitt Peak || Spacewatch ||  || align=right | 1.8 km || 
|-id=516 bgcolor=#fefefe
| 611516 ||  || — || December 9, 2006 || Socorro || LINEAR ||  || align=right | 1.1 km || 
|-id=517 bgcolor=#fefefe
| 611517 ||  || — || December 12, 2006 || Kitt Peak || Spacewatch ||  || align=right data-sort-value="0.73" | 730 m || 
|-id=518 bgcolor=#d6d6d6
| 611518 ||  || — || November 18, 2006 || Kitt Peak || Spacewatch ||  || align=right | 2.1 km || 
|-id=519 bgcolor=#fefefe
| 611519 ||  || — || December 9, 2006 || Kitt Peak || Spacewatch ||  || align=right data-sort-value="0.71" | 710 m || 
|-id=520 bgcolor=#fefefe
| 611520 ||  || — || December 9, 2006 || Kitt Peak || Spacewatch ||  || align=right data-sort-value="0.74" | 740 m || 
|-id=521 bgcolor=#fefefe
| 611521 ||  || — || November 25, 2006 || Kitt Peak || Spacewatch || MAS || align=right data-sort-value="0.60" | 600 m || 
|-id=522 bgcolor=#fefefe
| 611522 ||  || — || December 12, 2006 || Kitt Peak || Spacewatch ||  || align=right data-sort-value="0.58" | 580 m || 
|-id=523 bgcolor=#d6d6d6
| 611523 ||  || — || November 25, 2006 || Mount Lemmon || Mount Lemmon Survey ||  || align=right | 2.3 km || 
|-id=524 bgcolor=#fefefe
| 611524 ||  || — || December 13, 2006 || Kitt Peak || Spacewatch ||  || align=right data-sort-value="0.64" | 640 m || 
|-id=525 bgcolor=#d6d6d6
| 611525 ||  || — || November 19, 2006 || Kitt Peak || Spacewatch ||  || align=right | 2.2 km || 
|-id=526 bgcolor=#d6d6d6
| 611526 ||  || — || December 13, 2006 || Catalina || CSS ||  || align=right | 3.0 km || 
|-id=527 bgcolor=#d6d6d6
| 611527 ||  || — || December 13, 2006 || Kitt Peak || Spacewatch ||  || align=right | 2.2 km || 
|-id=528 bgcolor=#fefefe
| 611528 ||  || — || December 13, 2006 || Mount Lemmon || Mount Lemmon Survey ||  || align=right data-sort-value="0.65" | 650 m || 
|-id=529 bgcolor=#fefefe
| 611529 ||  || — || March 6, 2011 || Kitt Peak || Spacewatch ||  || align=right data-sort-value="0.87" | 870 m || 
|-id=530 bgcolor=#d6d6d6
| 611530 ||  || — || December 13, 2006 || Mount Lemmon || Mount Lemmon Survey ||  || align=right | 2.4 km || 
|-id=531 bgcolor=#d6d6d6
| 611531 ||  || — || January 3, 2012 || Mount Lemmon || Mount Lemmon Survey ||  || align=right | 2.9 km || 
|-id=532 bgcolor=#d6d6d6
| 611532 ||  || — || November 25, 2011 || Haleakala || Pan-STARRS ||  || align=right | 1.8 km || 
|-id=533 bgcolor=#fefefe
| 611533 ||  || — || January 3, 2011 || Mount Lemmon || Mount Lemmon Survey ||  || align=right data-sort-value="0.71" | 710 m || 
|-id=534 bgcolor=#d6d6d6
| 611534 ||  || — || December 13, 2006 || Kitt Peak || Spacewatch ||  || align=right | 2.3 km || 
|-id=535 bgcolor=#fefefe
| 611535 ||  || — || January 16, 2011 || Mount Lemmon || Mount Lemmon Survey ||  || align=right data-sort-value="0.67" | 670 m || 
|-id=536 bgcolor=#d6d6d6
| 611536 ||  || — || July 23, 2015 || Haleakala || Pan-STARRS 2 ||  || align=right | 2.1 km || 
|-id=537 bgcolor=#fefefe
| 611537 ||  || — || January 30, 2011 || Kitt Peak || Spacewatch ||  || align=right data-sort-value="0.58" | 580 m || 
|-id=538 bgcolor=#d6d6d6
| 611538 ||  || — || December 13, 2006 || Mount Lemmon || Mount Lemmon Survey ||  || align=right | 1.8 km || 
|-id=539 bgcolor=#d6d6d6
| 611539 ||  || — || December 13, 2006 || Kitt Peak || Spacewatch ||  || align=right | 1.9 km || 
|-id=540 bgcolor=#d6d6d6
| 611540 ||  || — || December 15, 2006 || Kitt Peak || Spacewatch ||  || align=right | 2.2 km || 
|-id=541 bgcolor=#d6d6d6
| 611541 ||  || — || December 15, 2006 || Kitt Peak || Spacewatch ||  || align=right | 1.9 km || 
|-id=542 bgcolor=#d6d6d6
| 611542 ||  || — || December 1, 2006 || Mount Lemmon || Mount Lemmon Survey ||  || align=right | 2.0 km || 
|-id=543 bgcolor=#fefefe
| 611543 ||  || — || March 18, 2004 || Kitt Peak || Spacewatch ||  || align=right data-sort-value="0.81" | 810 m || 
|-id=544 bgcolor=#fefefe
| 611544 ||  || — || December 16, 2006 || Pla D'Arguines || R. Ferrando, M. Ferrando ||  || align=right data-sort-value="0.89" | 890 m || 
|-id=545 bgcolor=#fefefe
| 611545 ||  || — || August 6, 2005 || Palomar || NEAT ||  || align=right | 1.0 km || 
|-id=546 bgcolor=#fefefe
| 611546 ||  || — || December 21, 2006 || Mount Lemmon || Mount Lemmon Survey ||  || align=right data-sort-value="0.70" | 700 m || 
|-id=547 bgcolor=#fefefe
| 611547 ||  || — || December 22, 2006 || Gaisberg || R. Gierlinger || MAS || align=right data-sort-value="0.54" | 540 m || 
|-id=548 bgcolor=#d6d6d6
| 611548 ||  || — || December 21, 2006 || Kitt Peak || Spacewatch ||  || align=right | 2.2 km || 
|-id=549 bgcolor=#fefefe
| 611549 ||  || — || December 21, 2006 || Kitt Peak || Spacewatch ||  || align=right | 1.0 km || 
|-id=550 bgcolor=#fefefe
| 611550 ||  || — || November 27, 2006 || Mount Lemmon || Mount Lemmon Survey ||  || align=right data-sort-value="0.67" | 670 m || 
|-id=551 bgcolor=#d6d6d6
| 611551 ||  || — || December 21, 2006 || Kitt Peak || Spacewatch ||  || align=right | 2.0 km || 
|-id=552 bgcolor=#fefefe
| 611552 ||  || — || December 21, 2006 || Kitt Peak || Spacewatch ||  || align=right data-sort-value="0.74" | 740 m || 
|-id=553 bgcolor=#d6d6d6
| 611553 ||  || — || December 21, 2006 || Kitt Peak || Spacewatch ||  || align=right | 2.3 km || 
|-id=554 bgcolor=#d6d6d6
| 611554 ||  || — || December 21, 2006 || Kitt Peak || Spacewatch ||  || align=right | 2.2 km || 
|-id=555 bgcolor=#d6d6d6
| 611555 ||  || — || December 21, 2006 || Kitt Peak || Spacewatch ||  || align=right | 1.9 km || 
|-id=556 bgcolor=#fefefe
| 611556 ||  || — || June 11, 2004 || Kitt Peak || Spacewatch ||  || align=right data-sort-value="0.93" | 930 m || 
|-id=557 bgcolor=#d6d6d6
| 611557 ||  || — || October 10, 2005 || Catalina || CSS ||  || align=right | 3.2 km || 
|-id=558 bgcolor=#d6d6d6
| 611558 ||  || — || December 21, 2006 || Kitt Peak || Spacewatch ||  || align=right | 2.3 km || 
|-id=559 bgcolor=#E9E9E9
| 611559 ||  || — || December 27, 2006 || Mount Lemmon || Mount Lemmon Survey ||  || align=right | 1.2 km || 
|-id=560 bgcolor=#fefefe
| 611560 ||  || — || August 2, 2009 || Siding Spring || SSS ||  || align=right data-sort-value="0.72" | 720 m || 
|-id=561 bgcolor=#fefefe
| 611561 ||  || — || January 17, 2015 || Haleakala || Pan-STARRS ||  || align=right data-sort-value="0.88" | 880 m || 
|-id=562 bgcolor=#d6d6d6
| 611562 ||  || — || May 22, 2015 || Haleakala || Pan-STARRS ||  || align=right | 3.6 km || 
|-id=563 bgcolor=#d6d6d6
| 611563 ||  || — || December 21, 2006 || Kitt Peak || Spacewatch ||  || align=right | 1.9 km || 
|-id=564 bgcolor=#d6d6d6
| 611564 ||  || — || March 8, 2008 || Mount Lemmon || Mount Lemmon Survey ||  || align=right | 2.0 km || 
|-id=565 bgcolor=#d6d6d6
| 611565 ||  || — || December 24, 2006 || Kitt Peak || Spacewatch ||  || align=right | 2.2 km || 
|-id=566 bgcolor=#fefefe
| 611566 ||  || — || December 15, 2017 || Mount Lemmon || Mount Lemmon Survey ||  || align=right data-sort-value="0.67" | 670 m || 
|-id=567 bgcolor=#fefefe
| 611567 ||  || — || February 8, 2011 || Mount Lemmon || Mount Lemmon Survey ||  || align=right data-sort-value="0.64" | 640 m || 
|-id=568 bgcolor=#d6d6d6
| 611568 ||  || — || May 7, 2014 || Haleakala || Pan-STARRS ||  || align=right | 2.3 km || 
|-id=569 bgcolor=#d6d6d6
| 611569 ||  || — || September 2, 2010 || Mount Lemmon || Mount Lemmon Survey ||  || align=right | 2.4 km || 
|-id=570 bgcolor=#fefefe
| 611570 ||  || — || January 12, 2011 || Mount Lemmon || Mount Lemmon Survey ||  || align=right data-sort-value="0.48" | 480 m || 
|-id=571 bgcolor=#d6d6d6
| 611571 ||  || — || December 24, 2006 || Kitt Peak || Spacewatch ||  || align=right | 2.4 km || 
|-id=572 bgcolor=#d6d6d6
| 611572 ||  || — || December 26, 2006 || Kitt Peak || Spacewatch ||  || align=right | 1.7 km || 
|-id=573 bgcolor=#d6d6d6
| 611573 ||  || — || December 26, 2006 || Kitt Peak || Spacewatch ||  || align=right | 1.7 km || 
|-id=574 bgcolor=#d6d6d6
| 611574 ||  || — || August 5, 2005 || Palomar || NEAT ||  || align=right | 3.2 km || 
|-id=575 bgcolor=#fefefe
| 611575 ||  || — || January 8, 2007 || Mount Lemmon || Mount Lemmon Survey ||  || align=right data-sort-value="0.74" | 740 m || 
|-id=576 bgcolor=#fefefe
| 611576 ||  || — || January 9, 2007 || Mount Lemmon || Mount Lemmon Survey ||  || align=right data-sort-value="0.79" | 790 m || 
|-id=577 bgcolor=#fefefe
| 611577 ||  || — || April 1, 2008 || Kitt Peak || Spacewatch ||  || align=right data-sort-value="0.56" | 560 m || 
|-id=578 bgcolor=#fefefe
| 611578 ||  || — || January 10, 2007 || Mount Lemmon || Mount Lemmon Survey ||  || align=right data-sort-value="0.49" | 490 m || 
|-id=579 bgcolor=#d6d6d6
| 611579 ||  || — || January 10, 2007 || Mount Lemmon || Mount Lemmon Survey ||  || align=right | 2.3 km || 
|-id=580 bgcolor=#d6d6d6
| 611580 ||  || — || January 17, 2007 || Catalina || CSS ||  || align=right | 2.6 km || 
|-id=581 bgcolor=#d6d6d6
| 611581 ||  || — || January 17, 2007 || Kitt Peak || Spacewatch ||  || align=right | 2.6 km || 
|-id=582 bgcolor=#d6d6d6
| 611582 ||  || — || December 21, 2006 || Mount Lemmon || Mount Lemmon Survey ||  || align=right | 2.4 km || 
|-id=583 bgcolor=#d6d6d6
| 611583 ||  || — || June 20, 2004 || Kitt Peak || Spacewatch ||  || align=right | 2.4 km || 
|-id=584 bgcolor=#fefefe
| 611584 ||  || — || January 24, 2007 || Mount Lemmon || Mount Lemmon Survey ||  || align=right data-sort-value="0.62" | 620 m || 
|-id=585 bgcolor=#d6d6d6
| 611585 ||  || — || January 20, 2007 || Mauna Kea || Mauna Kea Obs. ||  || align=right | 2.6 km || 
|-id=586 bgcolor=#d6d6d6
| 611586 ||  || — || January 23, 2007 || Mauna Kea || Mauna Kea Obs. ||  || align=right | 2.5 km || 
|-id=587 bgcolor=#d6d6d6
| 611587 ||  || — || January 23, 2007 || Mauna Kea || Mauna Kea Obs. ||  || align=right | 2.7 km || 
|-id=588 bgcolor=#d6d6d6
| 611588 ||  || — || January 24, 2007 || Mount Lemmon || Mount Lemmon Survey ||  || align=right | 2.1 km || 
|-id=589 bgcolor=#d6d6d6
| 611589 ||  || — || January 24, 2007 || Kitt Peak || Spacewatch ||  || align=right | 2.5 km || 
|-id=590 bgcolor=#fefefe
| 611590 ||  || — || January 24, 2007 || Kitt Peak || Spacewatch ||  || align=right data-sort-value="0.60" | 600 m || 
|-id=591 bgcolor=#fefefe
| 611591 ||  || — || January 24, 2007 || Kitt Peak || Spacewatch ||  || align=right data-sort-value="0.64" | 640 m || 
|-id=592 bgcolor=#fefefe
| 611592 ||  || — || January 17, 2007 || Kitt Peak || Spacewatch ||  || align=right data-sort-value="0.50" | 500 m || 
|-id=593 bgcolor=#fefefe
| 611593 ||  || — || December 21, 2006 || Kitt Peak || L. H. Wasserman ||  || align=right data-sort-value="0.62" | 620 m || 
|-id=594 bgcolor=#fefefe
| 611594 ||  || — || January 24, 2007 || Socorro || LINEAR ||  || align=right data-sort-value="0.80" | 800 m || 
|-id=595 bgcolor=#d6d6d6
| 611595 ||  || — || January 27, 2007 || Mount Lemmon || Mount Lemmon Survey ||  || align=right | 2.1 km || 
|-id=596 bgcolor=#fefefe
| 611596 ||  || — || January 27, 2007 || Mount Lemmon || Mount Lemmon Survey ||  || align=right data-sort-value="0.57" | 570 m || 
|-id=597 bgcolor=#fefefe
| 611597 ||  || — || January 27, 2007 || Mount Lemmon || Mount Lemmon Survey ||  || align=right data-sort-value="0.50" | 500 m || 
|-id=598 bgcolor=#d6d6d6
| 611598 ||  || — || January 19, 2007 || Mauna Kea || Mauna Kea Obs. ||  || align=right | 2.1 km || 
|-id=599 bgcolor=#d6d6d6
| 611599 ||  || — || February 8, 2007 || Mount Lemmon || Mount Lemmon Survey ||  || align=right | 1.6 km || 
|-id=600 bgcolor=#d6d6d6
| 611600 ||  || — || December 27, 2006 || Mount Lemmon || Mount Lemmon Survey ||  || align=right | 2.2 km || 
|}

611601–611700 

|-bgcolor=#d6d6d6
| 611601 ||  || — || March 29, 2008 || Kitt Peak || Spacewatch ||  || align=right | 2.1 km || 
|-id=602 bgcolor=#fefefe
| 611602 ||  || — || January 27, 2007 || Mount Lemmon || Mount Lemmon Survey ||  || align=right data-sort-value="0.84" | 840 m || 
|-id=603 bgcolor=#fefefe
| 611603 ||  || — || July 7, 2005 || Mauna Kea || Mauna Kea Obs. ||  || align=right data-sort-value="0.68" | 680 m || 
|-id=604 bgcolor=#fefefe
| 611604 ||  || — || January 17, 2007 || Kitt Peak || Spacewatch ||  || align=right data-sort-value="0.95" | 950 m || 
|-id=605 bgcolor=#fefefe
| 611605 ||  || — || January 27, 2007 || Kitt Peak || Spacewatch ||  || align=right data-sort-value="0.62" | 620 m || 
|-id=606 bgcolor=#d6d6d6
| 611606 ||  || — || August 21, 2015 || Haleakala || Pan-STARRS ||  || align=right | 2.4 km || 
|-id=607 bgcolor=#fefefe
| 611607 ||  || — || March 30, 2011 || Haleakala || Pan-STARRS ||  || align=right data-sort-value="0.88" | 880 m || 
|-id=608 bgcolor=#d6d6d6
| 611608 ||  || — || October 2, 2015 || Mount Lemmon || Mount Lemmon Survey ||  || align=right | 2.4 km || 
|-id=609 bgcolor=#d6d6d6
| 611609 ||  || — || January 26, 2007 || Kitt Peak || Spacewatch ||  || align=right | 1.7 km || 
|-id=610 bgcolor=#d6d6d6
| 611610 ||  || — || June 4, 2014 || Haleakala || Pan-STARRS ||  || align=right | 2.5 km || 
|-id=611 bgcolor=#fefefe
| 611611 ||  || — || January 10, 2007 || Kitt Peak || Spacewatch || H || align=right data-sort-value="0.55" | 550 m || 
|-id=612 bgcolor=#d6d6d6
| 611612 ||  || — || January 14, 2018 || Haleakala || Pan-STARRS ||  || align=right | 2.0 km || 
|-id=613 bgcolor=#fefefe
| 611613 ||  || — || January 28, 2007 || Mount Lemmon || Mount Lemmon Survey ||  || align=right data-sort-value="0.80" | 800 m || 
|-id=614 bgcolor=#fefefe
| 611614 ||  || — || October 3, 2013 || Haleakala || Pan-STARRS ||  || align=right data-sort-value="0.57" | 570 m || 
|-id=615 bgcolor=#d6d6d6
| 611615 ||  || — || January 28, 2007 || Mount Lemmon || Mount Lemmon Survey ||  || align=right | 2.3 km || 
|-id=616 bgcolor=#d6d6d6
| 611616 ||  || — || January 17, 2007 || Kitt Peak || Spacewatch ||  || align=right | 2.4 km || 
|-id=617 bgcolor=#d6d6d6
| 611617 ||  || — || January 27, 2007 || Kitt Peak || Spacewatch ||  || align=right | 2.0 km || 
|-id=618 bgcolor=#d6d6d6
| 611618 ||  || — || January 17, 2007 || Kitt Peak || Spacewatch ||  || align=right | 2.3 km || 
|-id=619 bgcolor=#fefefe
| 611619 ||  || — || November 17, 1998 || Kitt Peak || Spacewatch ||  || align=right data-sort-value="0.67" | 670 m || 
|-id=620 bgcolor=#d6d6d6
| 611620 ||  || — || January 28, 2007 || Kitt Peak || Spacewatch ||  || align=right | 2.0 km || 
|-id=621 bgcolor=#d6d6d6
| 611621 ||  || — || February 6, 2007 || Kitt Peak || Spacewatch ||  || align=right | 3.3 km || 
|-id=622 bgcolor=#d6d6d6
| 611622 ||  || — || January 28, 2007 || Kitt Peak || Spacewatch ||  || align=right | 1.9 km || 
|-id=623 bgcolor=#fefefe
| 611623 ||  || — || February 6, 2007 || Kitt Peak || Spacewatch ||  || align=right data-sort-value="0.65" | 650 m || 
|-id=624 bgcolor=#fefefe
| 611624 ||  || — || October 23, 2006 || Mount Lemmon || Mount Lemmon Survey ||  || align=right data-sort-value="0.91" | 910 m || 
|-id=625 bgcolor=#d6d6d6
| 611625 ||  || — || February 6, 2007 || Mount Lemmon || Mount Lemmon Survey ||  || align=right | 1.9 km || 
|-id=626 bgcolor=#fefefe
| 611626 ||  || — || February 10, 2007 || Mount Lemmon || Mount Lemmon Survey ||  || align=right data-sort-value="0.73" | 730 m || 
|-id=627 bgcolor=#d6d6d6
| 611627 ||  || — || September 30, 2005 || Palomar || NEAT ||  || align=right | 2.4 km || 
|-id=628 bgcolor=#d6d6d6
| 611628 ||  || — || November 12, 2005 || Kitt Peak || Spacewatch || 3:2 || align=right | 3.2 km || 
|-id=629 bgcolor=#d6d6d6
| 611629 ||  || — || February 10, 2007 || Mount Lemmon || Mount Lemmon Survey ||  || align=right | 2.2 km || 
|-id=630 bgcolor=#d6d6d6
| 611630 ||  || — || February 9, 2007 || Catalina || CSS ||  || align=right | 3.2 km || 
|-id=631 bgcolor=#fefefe
| 611631 ||  || — || January 28, 2007 || Mount Lemmon || Mount Lemmon Survey ||  || align=right data-sort-value="0.56" | 560 m || 
|-id=632 bgcolor=#d6d6d6
| 611632 ||  || — || January 27, 2007 || Kitt Peak || Spacewatch || 3:2 || align=right | 3.1 km || 
|-id=633 bgcolor=#d6d6d6
| 611633 ||  || — || January 28, 2007 || Kitt Peak || Spacewatch ||  || align=right | 2.0 km || 
|-id=634 bgcolor=#fefefe
| 611634 ||  || — || August 8, 2005 || Cerro Tololo || Cerro Tololo Obs. ||  || align=right data-sort-value="0.60" | 600 m || 
|-id=635 bgcolor=#fefefe
| 611635 ||  || — || February 16, 2007 || Mount Lemmon || Mount Lemmon Survey ||  || align=right data-sort-value="0.83" | 830 m || 
|-id=636 bgcolor=#d6d6d6
| 611636 ||  || — || February 14, 2007 || Mauna Kea || Mauna Kea Obs. ||  || align=right | 2.2 km || 
|-id=637 bgcolor=#d6d6d6
| 611637 ||  || — || February 14, 2007 || Mauna Kea || Mauna Kea Obs. ||  || align=right | 2.0 km || 
|-id=638 bgcolor=#fefefe
| 611638 ||  || — || March 28, 2011 || Kitt Peak || Spacewatch ||  || align=right data-sort-value="0.56" | 560 m || 
|-id=639 bgcolor=#fefefe
| 611639 ||  || — || February 7, 2007 || Palomar || NEAT ||  || align=right data-sort-value="0.96" | 960 m || 
|-id=640 bgcolor=#d6d6d6
| 611640 ||  || — || September 11, 2010 || Kitt Peak || Spacewatch ||  || align=right | 1.8 km || 
|-id=641 bgcolor=#d6d6d6
| 611641 ||  || — || November 12, 2010 || Kitt Peak || Spacewatch ||  || align=right | 2.1 km || 
|-id=642 bgcolor=#d6d6d6
| 611642 ||  || — || March 6, 2013 || Haleakala || Pan-STARRS ||  || align=right | 2.1 km || 
|-id=643 bgcolor=#d6d6d6
| 611643 ||  || — || July 1, 2014 || Haleakala || Pan-STARRS ||  || align=right | 2.2 km || 
|-id=644 bgcolor=#fefefe
| 611644 ||  || — || February 8, 2007 || Mount Lemmon || Mount Lemmon Survey ||  || align=right data-sort-value="0.65" | 650 m || 
|-id=645 bgcolor=#d6d6d6
| 611645 ||  || — || July 1, 2014 || Haleakala || Pan-STARRS ||  || align=right | 2.7 km || 
|-id=646 bgcolor=#d6d6d6
| 611646 ||  || — || February 13, 2007 || Mount Lemmon || Mount Lemmon Survey ||  || align=right | 2.2 km || 
|-id=647 bgcolor=#d6d6d6
| 611647 ||  || — || February 6, 2007 || Kitt Peak || Spacewatch ||  || align=right | 2.5 km || 
|-id=648 bgcolor=#d6d6d6
| 611648 ||  || — || February 16, 2007 || Cordell-Lorenz || Cordell–Lorenz Obs. ||  || align=right | 2.9 km || 
|-id=649 bgcolor=#d6d6d6
| 611649 ||  || — || February 16, 2007 || Mount Lemmon || Mount Lemmon Survey ||  || align=right | 3.7 km || 
|-id=650 bgcolor=#d6d6d6
| 611650 ||  || — || February 9, 2007 || Kitt Peak || Spacewatch ||  || align=right | 2.2 km || 
|-id=651 bgcolor=#d6d6d6
| 611651 ||  || — || February 17, 2007 || Kitt Peak || Spacewatch || 3:2 || align=right | 3.5 km || 
|-id=652 bgcolor=#d6d6d6
| 611652 ||  || — || February 8, 2007 || Kitt Peak || Spacewatch ||  || align=right | 1.8 km || 
|-id=653 bgcolor=#fefefe
| 611653 ||  || — || January 28, 2007 || Mount Lemmon || Mount Lemmon Survey ||  || align=right data-sort-value="0.69" | 690 m || 
|-id=654 bgcolor=#d6d6d6
| 611654 ||  || — || February 17, 2007 || Mount Lemmon || Mount Lemmon Survey ||  || align=right | 2.0 km || 
|-id=655 bgcolor=#d6d6d6
| 611655 ||  || — || February 17, 2007 || Kitt Peak || Spacewatch ||  || align=right | 2.7 km || 
|-id=656 bgcolor=#d6d6d6
| 611656 ||  || — || February 19, 2007 || Mount Lemmon || Mount Lemmon Survey ||  || align=right | 2.1 km || 
|-id=657 bgcolor=#fefefe
| 611657 ||  || — || October 14, 2001 || Apache Point || SDSS Collaboration ||  || align=right data-sort-value="0.94" | 940 m || 
|-id=658 bgcolor=#d6d6d6
| 611658 ||  || — || February 21, 2007 || Eskridge || G. Hug || EOS || align=right | 1.7 km || 
|-id=659 bgcolor=#d6d6d6
| 611659 ||  || — || February 17, 2007 || Kitt Peak || Spacewatch ||  || align=right | 2.5 km || 
|-id=660 bgcolor=#d6d6d6
| 611660 ||  || — || February 21, 2007 || Kitt Peak || Spacewatch ||  || align=right | 2.9 km || 
|-id=661 bgcolor=#d6d6d6
| 611661 ||  || — || February 22, 2007 || Kitt Peak || Spacewatch || HYG || align=right | 2.3 km || 
|-id=662 bgcolor=#d6d6d6
| 611662 ||  || — || February 21, 2007 || Kitt Peak || Spacewatch ||  || align=right | 1.8 km || 
|-id=663 bgcolor=#E9E9E9
| 611663 ||  || — || February 21, 2007 || Kitt Peak || Spacewatch ||  || align=right data-sort-value="0.94" | 940 m || 
|-id=664 bgcolor=#d6d6d6
| 611664 ||  || — || February 23, 2007 || Mount Lemmon || Mount Lemmon Survey ||  || align=right | 2.4 km || 
|-id=665 bgcolor=#d6d6d6
| 611665 ||  || — || February 21, 2007 || Mount Lemmon || Mount Lemmon Survey ||  || align=right | 2.2 km || 
|-id=666 bgcolor=#d6d6d6
| 611666 ||  || — || March 20, 2002 || Kitt Peak || Spacewatch ||  || align=right | 2.5 km || 
|-id=667 bgcolor=#fefefe
| 611667 ||  || — || January 27, 2007 || Mount Lemmon || Mount Lemmon Survey ||  || align=right data-sort-value="0.70" | 700 m || 
|-id=668 bgcolor=#E9E9E9
| 611668 ||  || — || February 23, 2007 || Mount Lemmon || Mount Lemmon Survey ||  || align=right | 1.2 km || 
|-id=669 bgcolor=#d6d6d6
| 611669 ||  || — || February 21, 2007 || Mount Lemmon || Mount Lemmon Survey ||  || align=right | 2.1 km || 
|-id=670 bgcolor=#fefefe
| 611670 ||  || — || February 23, 2007 || Catalina || CSS ||  || align=right | 1.0 km || 
|-id=671 bgcolor=#d6d6d6
| 611671 ||  || — || February 21, 2007 || Mount Lemmon || Mount Lemmon Survey ||  || align=right | 2.6 km || 
|-id=672 bgcolor=#d6d6d6
| 611672 ||  || — || February 23, 2007 || Kitt Peak || Spacewatch ||  || align=right | 3.3 km || 
|-id=673 bgcolor=#fefefe
| 611673 ||  || — || February 21, 2007 || Kitt Peak || Spacewatch ||  || align=right data-sort-value="0.87" | 870 m || 
|-id=674 bgcolor=#d6d6d6
| 611674 ||  || — || February 23, 2007 || Kitt Peak || Spacewatch ||  || align=right | 2.5 km || 
|-id=675 bgcolor=#E9E9E9
| 611675 ||  || — || January 15, 2015 || Haleakala || Pan-STARRS ||  || align=right | 1.5 km || 
|-id=676 bgcolor=#d6d6d6
| 611676 ||  || — || February 25, 2007 || Kitt Peak || Spacewatch ||  || align=right | 2.1 km || 
|-id=677 bgcolor=#d6d6d6
| 611677 ||  || — || January 15, 2018 || Haleakala || Pan-STARRS ||  || align=right | 2.4 km || 
|-id=678 bgcolor=#E9E9E9
| 611678 ||  || — || February 23, 2007 || Mount Lemmon || Mount Lemmon Survey ||  || align=right | 1.0 km || 
|-id=679 bgcolor=#fefefe
| 611679 ||  || — || March 1, 2011 || Mount Lemmon || Mount Lemmon Survey ||  || align=right data-sort-value="0.60" | 600 m || 
|-id=680 bgcolor=#d6d6d6
| 611680 ||  || — || February 25, 2007 || Mount Lemmon || Mount Lemmon Survey ||  || align=right | 2.6 km || 
|-id=681 bgcolor=#d6d6d6
| 611681 ||  || — || February 21, 2007 || Kitt Peak || Spacewatch ||  || align=right | 2.4 km || 
|-id=682 bgcolor=#d6d6d6
| 611682 ||  || — || February 23, 2007 || Kitt Peak || Spacewatch ||  || align=right | 2.3 km || 
|-id=683 bgcolor=#d6d6d6
| 611683 ||  || — || February 21, 2007 || Mount Lemmon || Mount Lemmon Survey ||  || align=right | 2.3 km || 
|-id=684 bgcolor=#fefefe
| 611684 ||  || — || February 23, 2007 || Kitt Peak || Spacewatch ||  || align=right data-sort-value="0.69" | 690 m || 
|-id=685 bgcolor=#d6d6d6
| 611685 ||  || — || March 9, 2007 || Mount Lemmon || Mount Lemmon Survey ||  || align=right | 2.3 km || 
|-id=686 bgcolor=#d6d6d6
| 611686 ||  || — || March 10, 2007 || Mount Lemmon || Mount Lemmon Survey ||  || align=right | 2.7 km || 
|-id=687 bgcolor=#d6d6d6
| 611687 ||  || — || March 11, 2007 || Mount Lemmon || Mount Lemmon Survey ||  || align=right | 2.9 km || 
|-id=688 bgcolor=#d6d6d6
| 611688 ||  || — || March 11, 2007 || Mount Lemmon || Mount Lemmon Survey ||  || align=right | 2.4 km || 
|-id=689 bgcolor=#E9E9E9
| 611689 ||  || — || March 11, 2007 || Kitt Peak || Spacewatch ||  || align=right data-sort-value="0.91" | 910 m || 
|-id=690 bgcolor=#d6d6d6
| 611690 ||  || — || March 11, 2007 || Kitt Peak || Spacewatch ||  || align=right | 2.6 km || 
|-id=691 bgcolor=#d6d6d6
| 611691 ||  || — || March 10, 2007 || Mount Lemmon || Mount Lemmon Survey ||  || align=right | 2.4 km || 
|-id=692 bgcolor=#fefefe
| 611692 ||  || — || March 10, 2007 || Mount Lemmon || Mount Lemmon Survey ||  || align=right data-sort-value="0.49" | 490 m || 
|-id=693 bgcolor=#d6d6d6
| 611693 ||  || — || March 10, 2007 || Mount Lemmon || Mount Lemmon Survey ||  || align=right | 2.4 km || 
|-id=694 bgcolor=#d6d6d6
| 611694 ||  || — || March 12, 2007 || Mount Lemmon || Mount Lemmon Survey ||  || align=right | 2.1 km || 
|-id=695 bgcolor=#d6d6d6
| 611695 ||  || — || March 12, 2007 || Kitt Peak || Spacewatch ||  || align=right | 2.9 km || 
|-id=696 bgcolor=#d6d6d6
| 611696 ||  || — || March 11, 1996 || Kitt Peak || Spacewatch ||  || align=right | 2.5 km || 
|-id=697 bgcolor=#fefefe
| 611697 ||  || — || February 21, 2007 || Mount Lemmon || Mount Lemmon Survey ||  || align=right data-sort-value="0.57" | 570 m || 
|-id=698 bgcolor=#fefefe
| 611698 ||  || — || March 10, 2007 || Kitt Peak || Spacewatch ||  || align=right data-sort-value="0.81" | 810 m || 
|-id=699 bgcolor=#d6d6d6
| 611699 ||  || — || March 10, 2007 || Kitt Peak || Spacewatch ||  || align=right | 2.1 km || 
|-id=700 bgcolor=#d6d6d6
| 611700 ||  || — || March 10, 2007 || Kitt Peak || Spacewatch ||  || align=right | 2.4 km || 
|}

611701–611800 

|-bgcolor=#E9E9E9
| 611701 ||  || — || March 10, 2007 || Kitt Peak || Spacewatch ||  || align=right data-sort-value="0.69" | 690 m || 
|-id=702 bgcolor=#d6d6d6
| 611702 ||  || — || February 26, 2007 || Mount Lemmon || Mount Lemmon Survey ||  || align=right | 3.3 km || 
|-id=703 bgcolor=#d6d6d6
| 611703 ||  || — || March 10, 2007 || Mount Lemmon || Mount Lemmon Survey ||  || align=right | 3.2 km || 
|-id=704 bgcolor=#fefefe
| 611704 ||  || — || March 10, 2007 || Kitt Peak || Spacewatch ||  || align=right data-sort-value="0.64" | 640 m || 
|-id=705 bgcolor=#d6d6d6
| 611705 ||  || — || March 10, 2007 || Mount Lemmon || Mount Lemmon Survey ||  || align=right | 2.5 km || 
|-id=706 bgcolor=#fefefe
| 611706 ||  || — || March 10, 2007 || Kitt Peak || Spacewatch ||  || align=right data-sort-value="0.79" | 790 m || 
|-id=707 bgcolor=#d6d6d6
| 611707 ||  || — || March 10, 2007 || Mount Lemmon || Mount Lemmon Survey ||  || align=right | 2.0 km || 
|-id=708 bgcolor=#d6d6d6
| 611708 ||  || — || November 4, 2004 || Kitt Peak || Spacewatch ||  || align=right | 3.3 km || 
|-id=709 bgcolor=#fefefe
| 611709 ||  || — || October 21, 2001 || Kitt Peak || Spacewatch ||  || align=right data-sort-value="0.87" | 870 m || 
|-id=710 bgcolor=#fefefe
| 611710 ||  || — || March 10, 2007 || Mount Lemmon || Mount Lemmon Survey ||  || align=right data-sort-value="0.87" | 870 m || 
|-id=711 bgcolor=#d6d6d6
| 611711 ||  || — || March 11, 2007 || Kitt Peak || Spacewatch || 3:2 || align=right | 3.4 km || 
|-id=712 bgcolor=#fefefe
| 611712 ||  || — || March 10, 2003 || Palomar || NEAT ||  || align=right data-sort-value="0.88" | 880 m || 
|-id=713 bgcolor=#d6d6d6
| 611713 ||  || — || February 23, 2007 || Kitt Peak || Spacewatch ||  || align=right | 1.7 km || 
|-id=714 bgcolor=#d6d6d6
| 611714 ||  || — || March 13, 2007 || Mount Lemmon || Mount Lemmon Survey ||  || align=right | 2.8 km || 
|-id=715 bgcolor=#d6d6d6
| 611715 ||  || — || March 14, 2007 || Mount Lemmon || Mount Lemmon Survey ||  || align=right | 2.3 km || 
|-id=716 bgcolor=#d6d6d6
| 611716 ||  || — || March 14, 2007 || Mount Lemmon || Mount Lemmon Survey ||  || align=right | 2.0 km || 
|-id=717 bgcolor=#d6d6d6
| 611717 ||  || — || March 14, 2007 || Mount Lemmon || Mount Lemmon Survey ||  || align=right | 1.9 km || 
|-id=718 bgcolor=#d6d6d6
| 611718 ||  || — || March 11, 2007 || Kitt Peak || Spacewatch ||  || align=right | 2.1 km || 
|-id=719 bgcolor=#d6d6d6
| 611719 ||  || — || February 23, 2007 || Mount Lemmon || Mount Lemmon Survey ||  || align=right | 2.2 km || 
|-id=720 bgcolor=#E9E9E9
| 611720 ||  || — || March 9, 2007 || Mount Lemmon || Mount Lemmon Survey ||  || align=right data-sort-value="0.67" | 670 m || 
|-id=721 bgcolor=#d6d6d6
| 611721 ||  || — || March 12, 2007 || Mount Lemmon || Mount Lemmon Survey ||  || align=right | 2.0 km || 
|-id=722 bgcolor=#d6d6d6
| 611722 ||  || — || March 12, 2007 || Kitt Peak || Spacewatch ||  || align=right | 2.9 km || 
|-id=723 bgcolor=#fefefe
| 611723 ||  || — || March 12, 2007 || Kitt Peak || Spacewatch ||  || align=right data-sort-value="0.94" | 940 m || 
|-id=724 bgcolor=#d6d6d6
| 611724 ||  || — || March 12, 2007 || Mount Lemmon || Mount Lemmon Survey ||  || align=right | 2.5 km || 
|-id=725 bgcolor=#fefefe
| 611725 ||  || — || March 12, 2007 || Mount Lemmon || Mount Lemmon Survey ||  || align=right data-sort-value="0.77" | 770 m || 
|-id=726 bgcolor=#d6d6d6
| 611726 ||  || — || September 22, 2004 || Kitt Peak || Spacewatch ||  || align=right | 3.3 km || 
|-id=727 bgcolor=#d6d6d6
| 611727 ||  || — || March 12, 2007 || Mount Lemmon || Mount Lemmon Survey ||  || align=right | 2.2 km || 
|-id=728 bgcolor=#d6d6d6
| 611728 ||  || — || March 12, 2007 || Kitt Peak || Spacewatch ||  || align=right | 3.2 km || 
|-id=729 bgcolor=#E9E9E9
| 611729 ||  || — || March 12, 2007 || Kitt Peak || Spacewatch ||  || align=right data-sort-value="0.94" | 940 m || 
|-id=730 bgcolor=#d6d6d6
| 611730 ||  || — || March 14, 2007 || Mount Lemmon || Mount Lemmon Survey ||  || align=right | 2.7 km || 
|-id=731 bgcolor=#E9E9E9
| 611731 ||  || — || March 14, 2007 || Mount Lemmon || Mount Lemmon Survey ||  || align=right | 1.1 km || 
|-id=732 bgcolor=#d6d6d6
| 611732 ||  || — || March 15, 2007 || Mount Lemmon || Mount Lemmon Survey ||  || align=right | 1.9 km || 
|-id=733 bgcolor=#d6d6d6
| 611733 ||  || — || March 15, 2007 || Mount Lemmon || Mount Lemmon Survey ||  || align=right | 2.4 km || 
|-id=734 bgcolor=#d6d6d6
| 611734 ||  || — || March 15, 2007 || Mount Lemmon || Mount Lemmon Survey ||  || align=right | 2.4 km || 
|-id=735 bgcolor=#d6d6d6
| 611735 ||  || — || March 9, 2007 || Catalina || CSS ||  || align=right | 2.8 km || 
|-id=736 bgcolor=#d6d6d6
| 611736 ||  || — || March 15, 2007 || Kitt Peak || Spacewatch ||  || align=right | 2.4 km || 
|-id=737 bgcolor=#d6d6d6
| 611737 ||  || — || March 14, 2007 || Kitt Peak || Spacewatch ||  || align=right | 2.0 km || 
|-id=738 bgcolor=#fefefe
| 611738 ||  || — || March 14, 2007 || Kitt Peak || Spacewatch ||  || align=right data-sort-value="0.63" | 630 m || 
|-id=739 bgcolor=#d6d6d6
| 611739 ||  || — || March 14, 2007 || Kitt Peak || Spacewatch ||  || align=right | 2.5 km || 
|-id=740 bgcolor=#d6d6d6
| 611740 ||  || — || March 14, 2007 || Kitt Peak || Spacewatch ||  || align=right | 2.3 km || 
|-id=741 bgcolor=#E9E9E9
| 611741 ||  || — || March 14, 2007 || Kitt Peak || Spacewatch ||  || align=right | 1.3 km || 
|-id=742 bgcolor=#E9E9E9
| 611742 ||  || — || April 25, 2003 || Kitt Peak || Spacewatch ||  || align=right data-sort-value="0.88" | 880 m || 
|-id=743 bgcolor=#E9E9E9
| 611743 ||  || — || March 14, 2007 || Kitt Peak || Spacewatch ||  || align=right data-sort-value="0.88" | 880 m || 
|-id=744 bgcolor=#d6d6d6
| 611744 ||  || — || March 14, 2007 || Kitt Peak || Spacewatch ||  || align=right | 2.6 km || 
|-id=745 bgcolor=#d6d6d6
| 611745 ||  || — || November 24, 2003 || Kitt Peak || Kitt Peak Obs. ||  || align=right | 2.5 km || 
|-id=746 bgcolor=#d6d6d6
| 611746 ||  || — || February 17, 2007 || Kitt Peak || Spacewatch ||  || align=right | 2.8 km || 
|-id=747 bgcolor=#d6d6d6
| 611747 ||  || — || March 14, 2007 || Mount Lemmon || Mount Lemmon Survey ||  || align=right | 2.7 km || 
|-id=748 bgcolor=#fefefe
| 611748 ||  || — || March 14, 2007 || Catalina || CSS ||  || align=right | 1.2 km || 
|-id=749 bgcolor=#d6d6d6
| 611749 ||  || — || March 14, 2007 || Catalina || CSS ||  || align=right | 4.1 km || 
|-id=750 bgcolor=#d6d6d6
| 611750 ||  || — || February 27, 2007 || Kitt Peak || Spacewatch ||  || align=right | 2.1 km || 
|-id=751 bgcolor=#d6d6d6
| 611751 ||  || — || March 9, 2007 || Mount Lemmon || Mount Lemmon Survey || EOS || align=right | 1.7 km || 
|-id=752 bgcolor=#E9E9E9
| 611752 ||  || — || March 14, 2007 || Kitt Peak || Spacewatch ||  || align=right data-sort-value="0.75" | 750 m || 
|-id=753 bgcolor=#d6d6d6
| 611753 ||  || — || March 15, 2007 || Kitt Peak || Spacewatch ||  || align=right | 1.7 km || 
|-id=754 bgcolor=#d6d6d6
| 611754 ||  || — || March 12, 2007 || Mount Lemmon || Mount Lemmon Survey ||  || align=right | 2.0 km || 
|-id=755 bgcolor=#d6d6d6
| 611755 ||  || — || March 13, 2007 || Kitt Peak || Spacewatch ||  || align=right | 2.2 km || 
|-id=756 bgcolor=#d6d6d6
| 611756 ||  || — || March 13, 2007 || Kitt Peak || Spacewatch ||  || align=right | 2.4 km || 
|-id=757 bgcolor=#d6d6d6
| 611757 ||  || — || November 12, 2005 || Kitt Peak || Spacewatch || 3:2 || align=right | 2.5 km || 
|-id=758 bgcolor=#d6d6d6
| 611758 ||  || — || March 10, 2007 || Mount Lemmon || Mount Lemmon Survey ||  || align=right | 2.2 km || 
|-id=759 bgcolor=#d6d6d6
| 611759 ||  || — || March 12, 2007 || Kitt Peak || Spacewatch ||  || align=right | 2.2 km || 
|-id=760 bgcolor=#fefefe
| 611760 ||  || — || March 10, 2007 || Mount Lemmon || Mount Lemmon Survey ||  || align=right data-sort-value="0.79" | 790 m || 
|-id=761 bgcolor=#d6d6d6
| 611761 ||  || — || March 12, 2007 || Catalina || CSS ||  || align=right | 3.7 km || 
|-id=762 bgcolor=#d6d6d6
| 611762 ||  || — || March 14, 2007 || Mount Lemmon || Mount Lemmon Survey ||  || align=right | 3.4 km || 
|-id=763 bgcolor=#d6d6d6
| 611763 ||  || — || March 9, 2007 || Kitt Peak || Spacewatch ||  || align=right | 2.5 km || 
|-id=764 bgcolor=#d6d6d6
| 611764 ||  || — || November 3, 2015 || Mount Lemmon || Mount Lemmon Survey ||  || align=right | 2.1 km || 
|-id=765 bgcolor=#d6d6d6
| 611765 ||  || — || March 10, 2007 || Kitt Peak || Spacewatch ||  || align=right | 2.3 km || 
|-id=766 bgcolor=#d6d6d6
| 611766 ||  || — || February 25, 2007 || Kitt Peak || Spacewatch ||  || align=right | 3.2 km || 
|-id=767 bgcolor=#d6d6d6
| 611767 ||  || — || March 11, 2007 || Mount Lemmon || Mount Lemmon Survey ||  || align=right | 2.1 km || 
|-id=768 bgcolor=#E9E9E9
| 611768 ||  || — || June 9, 2016 || Haleakala || Pan-STARRS ||  || align=right data-sort-value="0.88" | 880 m || 
|-id=769 bgcolor=#d6d6d6
| 611769 ||  || — || March 14, 2007 || Kitt Peak || Spacewatch ||  || align=right | 2.5 km || 
|-id=770 bgcolor=#d6d6d6
| 611770 ||  || — || April 6, 2013 || Mount Lemmon || Mount Lemmon Survey ||  || align=right | 2.1 km || 
|-id=771 bgcolor=#d6d6d6
| 611771 ||  || — || January 29, 2012 || Kitt Peak || Spacewatch ||  || align=right | 1.7 km || 
|-id=772 bgcolor=#d6d6d6
| 611772 ||  || — || June 25, 2014 || Mount Lemmon || Mount Lemmon Survey ||  || align=right | 2.0 km || 
|-id=773 bgcolor=#d6d6d6
| 611773 ||  || — || November 21, 2015 || Mount Lemmon || Mount Lemmon Survey ||  || align=right | 2.4 km || 
|-id=774 bgcolor=#d6d6d6
| 611774 ||  || — || March 10, 2007 || Kitt Peak || Spacewatch ||  || align=right | 1.6 km || 
|-id=775 bgcolor=#fefefe
| 611775 ||  || — || July 12, 2016 || Mount Lemmon || Mount Lemmon Survey ||  || align=right data-sort-value="0.67" | 670 m || 
|-id=776 bgcolor=#d6d6d6
| 611776 ||  || — || March 12, 2007 || Kitt Peak || Spacewatch ||  || align=right | 2.1 km || 
|-id=777 bgcolor=#d6d6d6
| 611777 ||  || — || September 3, 2014 || Mount Lemmon || Mount Lemmon Survey ||  || align=right | 2.1 km || 
|-id=778 bgcolor=#d6d6d6
| 611778 ||  || — || September 27, 2009 || Kitt Peak || Spacewatch ||  || align=right | 2.5 km || 
|-id=779 bgcolor=#d6d6d6
| 611779 ||  || — || March 11, 2007 || Mount Lemmon || Mount Lemmon Survey ||  || align=right | 2.1 km || 
|-id=780 bgcolor=#d6d6d6
| 611780 ||  || — || October 7, 2012 || Haleakala || Pan-STARRS || 3:2 || align=right | 3.4 km || 
|-id=781 bgcolor=#d6d6d6
| 611781 ||  || — || October 17, 2010 || Mount Lemmon || Mount Lemmon Survey ||  || align=right | 2.2 km || 
|-id=782 bgcolor=#d6d6d6
| 611782 ||  || — || March 19, 2013 || Haleakala || Pan-STARRS ||  || align=right | 2.1 km || 
|-id=783 bgcolor=#d6d6d6
| 611783 ||  || — || March 9, 2007 || Kitt Peak || Spacewatch ||  || align=right | 2.0 km || 
|-id=784 bgcolor=#d6d6d6
| 611784 ||  || — || March 14, 2007 || Mount Lemmon || Mount Lemmon Survey ||  || align=right | 2.5 km || 
|-id=785 bgcolor=#d6d6d6
| 611785 ||  || — || March 14, 2007 || Mount Lemmon || Mount Lemmon Survey ||  || align=right | 2.4 km || 
|-id=786 bgcolor=#d6d6d6
| 611786 ||  || — || March 11, 2007 || Kitt Peak || Spacewatch ||  || align=right | 2.5 km || 
|-id=787 bgcolor=#d6d6d6
| 611787 ||  || — || March 14, 2007 || Mount Lemmon || Mount Lemmon Survey ||  || align=right | 2.4 km || 
|-id=788 bgcolor=#d6d6d6
| 611788 ||  || — || March 13, 2007 || Mount Lemmon || Mount Lemmon Survey ||  || align=right | 2.3 km || 
|-id=789 bgcolor=#d6d6d6
| 611789 ||  || — || March 13, 2007 || Kitt Peak || Spacewatch || Tj (2.89) || align=right | 3.8 km || 
|-id=790 bgcolor=#d6d6d6
| 611790 ||  || — || March 14, 2007 || Mount Lemmon || Mount Lemmon Survey ||  || align=right | 2.6 km || 
|-id=791 bgcolor=#d6d6d6
| 611791 ||  || — || March 15, 2007 || Kitt Peak || Spacewatch ||  || align=right | 2.0 km || 
|-id=792 bgcolor=#d6d6d6
| 611792 ||  || — || March 18, 2007 || Nyukasa || H. Kurosaki, A. Nakajima ||  || align=right | 2.7 km || 
|-id=793 bgcolor=#E9E9E9
| 611793 ||  || — || March 18, 2007 || Nyukasa || H. Kurosaki, A. Nakajima ||  || align=right | 1.2 km || 
|-id=794 bgcolor=#E9E9E9
| 611794 ||  || — || March 16, 2007 || Mount Lemmon || Mount Lemmon Survey ||  || align=right data-sort-value="0.92" | 920 m || 
|-id=795 bgcolor=#d6d6d6
| 611795 ||  || — || March 16, 2007 || Mount Lemmon || Mount Lemmon Survey ||  || align=right | 2.2 km || 
|-id=796 bgcolor=#d6d6d6
| 611796 ||  || — || March 16, 2007 || Kitt Peak || Spacewatch ||  || align=right | 3.4 km || 
|-id=797 bgcolor=#d6d6d6
| 611797 ||  || — || March 9, 2007 || Kitt Peak || Spacewatch ||  || align=right | 2.4 km || 
|-id=798 bgcolor=#d6d6d6
| 611798 ||  || — || March 19, 2007 || Mount Lemmon || Mount Lemmon Survey ||  || align=right | 2.6 km || 
|-id=799 bgcolor=#fefefe
| 611799 ||  || — || March 19, 2007 || Mount Lemmon || Mount Lemmon Survey ||  || align=right data-sort-value="0.70" | 700 m || 
|-id=800 bgcolor=#d6d6d6
| 611800 ||  || — || May 3, 2002 || Kitt Peak || Spacewatch ||  || align=right | 3.6 km || 
|}

611801–611900 

|-bgcolor=#d6d6d6
| 611801 ||  || — || March 16, 2007 || Mount Lemmon || Mount Lemmon Survey ||  || align=right | 2.1 km || 
|-id=802 bgcolor=#d6d6d6
| 611802 ||  || — || March 26, 2007 || Mount Lemmon || Mount Lemmon Survey ||  || align=right | 2.4 km || 
|-id=803 bgcolor=#d6d6d6
| 611803 ||  || — || March 20, 2007 || Mount Lemmon || Mount Lemmon Survey ||  || align=right | 3.5 km || 
|-id=804 bgcolor=#fefefe
| 611804 ||  || — || August 24, 2001 || Kitt Peak || Spacewatch ||  || align=right data-sort-value="0.57" | 570 m || 
|-id=805 bgcolor=#d6d6d6
| 611805 ||  || — || September 19, 1998 || Apache Point || SDSS Collaboration ||  || align=right | 2.2 km || 
|-id=806 bgcolor=#d6d6d6
| 611806 ||  || — || March 25, 2007 || Mount Lemmon || Mount Lemmon Survey ||  || align=right | 2.6 km || 
|-id=807 bgcolor=#d6d6d6
| 611807 ||  || — || March 25, 2007 || Mount Lemmon || Mount Lemmon Survey ||  || align=right | 2.2 km || 
|-id=808 bgcolor=#fefefe
| 611808 ||  || — || March 26, 2007 || Mount Lemmon || Mount Lemmon Survey ||  || align=right data-sort-value="0.67" | 670 m || 
|-id=809 bgcolor=#fefefe
| 611809 ||  || — || October 21, 2009 || Mount Lemmon || Mount Lemmon Survey ||  || align=right data-sort-value="0.70" | 700 m || 
|-id=810 bgcolor=#E9E9E9
| 611810 ||  || — || March 20, 2007 || Kitt Peak || Spacewatch ||  || align=right | 1.4 km || 
|-id=811 bgcolor=#d6d6d6
| 611811 ||  || — || August 3, 2014 || Haleakala || Pan-STARRS ||  || align=right | 2.3 km || 
|-id=812 bgcolor=#d6d6d6
| 611812 ||  || — || October 25, 2015 || Haleakala || Pan-STARRS ||  || align=right | 2.5 km || 
|-id=813 bgcolor=#d6d6d6
| 611813 ||  || — || February 3, 2012 || Haleakala || Pan-STARRS ||  || align=right | 2.2 km || 
|-id=814 bgcolor=#fefefe
| 611814 ||  || — || March 18, 2007 || Kitt Peak || Spacewatch ||  || align=right data-sort-value="0.72" | 720 m || 
|-id=815 bgcolor=#d6d6d6
| 611815 ||  || — || March 15, 2012 || Mount Lemmon || Mount Lemmon Survey ||  || align=right | 2.1 km || 
|-id=816 bgcolor=#d6d6d6
| 611816 ||  || — || March 17, 2018 || Haleakala || Pan-STARRS ||  || align=right | 2.0 km || 
|-id=817 bgcolor=#d6d6d6
| 611817 ||  || — || March 16, 2007 || Mount Lemmon || Mount Lemmon Survey ||  || align=right | 2.0 km || 
|-id=818 bgcolor=#d6d6d6
| 611818 ||  || — || February 3, 2012 || Haleakala || Pan-STARRS ||  || align=right | 2.2 km || 
|-id=819 bgcolor=#d6d6d6
| 611819 ||  || — || April 12, 2013 || Haleakala || Pan-STARRS ||  || align=right | 2.0 km || 
|-id=820 bgcolor=#d6d6d6
| 611820 ||  || — || July 29, 2014 || Haleakala || Pan-STARRS ||  || align=right | 2.0 km || 
|-id=821 bgcolor=#d6d6d6
| 611821 ||  || — || October 11, 2012 || Mount Lemmon || Mount Lemmon Survey || 3:2 || align=right | 3.1 km || 
|-id=822 bgcolor=#d6d6d6
| 611822 ||  || — || March 25, 2007 || Mount Lemmon || Mount Lemmon Survey ||  || align=right | 2.3 km || 
|-id=823 bgcolor=#d6d6d6
| 611823 ||  || — || March 26, 2007 || Kitt Peak || Spacewatch ||  || align=right | 2.2 km || 
|-id=824 bgcolor=#d6d6d6
| 611824 ||  || — || March 26, 2007 || Mount Lemmon || Mount Lemmon Survey ||  || align=right | 2.1 km || 
|-id=825 bgcolor=#fefefe
| 611825 ||  || — || March 18, 2007 || Kitt Peak || Spacewatch ||  || align=right data-sort-value="0.71" | 710 m || 
|-id=826 bgcolor=#fefefe
| 611826 ||  || — || March 16, 2007 || Kitt Peak || Spacewatch ||  || align=right data-sort-value="0.70" | 700 m || 
|-id=827 bgcolor=#d6d6d6
| 611827 ||  || — || March 20, 2007 || Mount Lemmon || Mount Lemmon Survey ||  || align=right | 2.2 km || 
|-id=828 bgcolor=#d6d6d6
| 611828 ||  || — || March 25, 2007 || Mount Lemmon || Mount Lemmon Survey ||  || align=right | 2.8 km || 
|-id=829 bgcolor=#d6d6d6
| 611829 ||  || — || March 20, 2007 || Catalina || CSS ||  || align=right | 2.9 km || 
|-id=830 bgcolor=#d6d6d6
| 611830 ||  || — || March 11, 2007 || Mount Lemmon || Mount Lemmon Survey ||  || align=right | 2.6 km || 
|-id=831 bgcolor=#d6d6d6
| 611831 ||  || — || April 11, 2007 || Kitt Peak || Spacewatch ||  || align=right | 2.5 km || 
|-id=832 bgcolor=#d6d6d6
| 611832 ||  || — || April 11, 2007 || Kitt Peak || Spacewatch ||  || align=right | 2.7 km || 
|-id=833 bgcolor=#d6d6d6
| 611833 ||  || — || April 11, 2007 || Kitt Peak || Spacewatch ||  || align=right | 2.6 km || 
|-id=834 bgcolor=#d6d6d6
| 611834 ||  || — || April 11, 2007 || Kitt Peak || Spacewatch ||  || align=right | 3.8 km || 
|-id=835 bgcolor=#d6d6d6
| 611835 ||  || — || April 11, 2007 || Mount Lemmon || Mount Lemmon Survey ||  || align=right | 2.6 km || 
|-id=836 bgcolor=#d6d6d6
| 611836 ||  || — || April 11, 2007 || Mount Lemmon || Mount Lemmon Survey ||  || align=right | 2.7 km || 
|-id=837 bgcolor=#d6d6d6
| 611837 ||  || — || April 11, 2007 || Kitt Peak || Spacewatch ||  || align=right | 2.6 km || 
|-id=838 bgcolor=#d6d6d6
| 611838 ||  || — || April 14, 2007 || Kitt Peak || Spacewatch ||  || align=right | 3.2 km || 
|-id=839 bgcolor=#E9E9E9
| 611839 ||  || — || March 13, 2007 || Mount Lemmon || Mount Lemmon Survey ||  || align=right data-sort-value="0.80" | 800 m || 
|-id=840 bgcolor=#E9E9E9
| 611840 ||  || — || April 14, 2007 || Kitt Peak || Spacewatch ||  || align=right data-sort-value="0.95" | 950 m || 
|-id=841 bgcolor=#E9E9E9
| 611841 ||  || — || April 14, 2007 || Mount Lemmon || Mount Lemmon Survey ||  || align=right data-sort-value="0.90" | 900 m || 
|-id=842 bgcolor=#fefefe
| 611842 ||  || — || November 4, 2005 || Mount Lemmon || Mount Lemmon Survey ||  || align=right data-sort-value="0.94" | 940 m || 
|-id=843 bgcolor=#d6d6d6
| 611843 ||  || — || April 14, 2007 || Kitt Peak || Spacewatch ||  || align=right | 3.6 km || 
|-id=844 bgcolor=#E9E9E9
| 611844 ||  || — || March 15, 2007 || Mount Lemmon || Mount Lemmon Survey ||  || align=right | 1.1 km || 
|-id=845 bgcolor=#d6d6d6
| 611845 ||  || — || April 14, 2007 || Kitt Peak || Spacewatch ||  || align=right | 3.4 km || 
|-id=846 bgcolor=#d6d6d6
| 611846 ||  || — || April 15, 2007 || Kitt Peak || Spacewatch ||  || align=right | 2.2 km || 
|-id=847 bgcolor=#E9E9E9
| 611847 ||  || — || May 23, 2003 || Kitt Peak || Spacewatch ||  || align=right data-sort-value="0.98" | 980 m || 
|-id=848 bgcolor=#d6d6d6
| 611848 ||  || — || April 15, 2007 || Kitt Peak || Spacewatch ||  || align=right | 2.9 km || 
|-id=849 bgcolor=#d6d6d6
| 611849 ||  || — || September 22, 2003 || Kitt Peak || Spacewatch ||  || align=right | 2.5 km || 
|-id=850 bgcolor=#d6d6d6
| 611850 ||  || — || April 15, 2007 || Kitt Peak || Spacewatch ||  || align=right | 2.1 km || 
|-id=851 bgcolor=#E9E9E9
| 611851 ||  || — || April 14, 2007 || Mount Lemmon || Mount Lemmon Survey ||  || align=right data-sort-value="0.86" | 860 m || 
|-id=852 bgcolor=#d6d6d6
| 611852 ||  || — || March 29, 2007 || Kitt Peak || Spacewatch ||  || align=right | 2.1 km || 
|-id=853 bgcolor=#E9E9E9
| 611853 ||  || — || March 11, 2007 || Mount Lemmon || Mount Lemmon Survey ||  || align=right data-sort-value="0.68" | 680 m || 
|-id=854 bgcolor=#d6d6d6
| 611854 ||  || — || April 11, 2007 || Kitt Peak || Spacewatch ||  || align=right | 2.3 km || 
|-id=855 bgcolor=#d6d6d6
| 611855 ||  || — || April 14, 2007 || Mount Lemmon || Mount Lemmon Survey ||  || align=right | 3.1 km || 
|-id=856 bgcolor=#d6d6d6
| 611856 ||  || — || April 15, 2007 || Kitt Peak || Spacewatch ||  || align=right | 3.1 km || 
|-id=857 bgcolor=#d6d6d6
| 611857 ||  || — || May 19, 2013 || Mount Lemmon || Mount Lemmon Survey ||  || align=right | 2.6 km || 
|-id=858 bgcolor=#d6d6d6
| 611858 ||  || — || June 29, 2014 || Haleakala || Pan-STARRS ||  || align=right | 2.4 km || 
|-id=859 bgcolor=#fefefe
| 611859 ||  || — || April 15, 2007 || Kitt Peak || Spacewatch ||  || align=right data-sort-value="0.47" | 470 m || 
|-id=860 bgcolor=#d6d6d6
| 611860 ||  || — || April 15, 2007 || Kitt Peak || Spacewatch ||  || align=right | 2.1 km || 
|-id=861 bgcolor=#fefefe
| 611861 ||  || — || April 16, 2007 || Mount Lemmon || Mount Lemmon Survey ||  || align=right data-sort-value="0.43" | 430 m || 
|-id=862 bgcolor=#d6d6d6
| 611862 ||  || — || April 16, 2007 || Mount Lemmon || Mount Lemmon Survey || Tj (2.98) || align=right | 3.0 km || 
|-id=863 bgcolor=#fefefe
| 611863 ||  || — || April 18, 2007 || Kitt Peak || Spacewatch || H || align=right data-sort-value="0.57" | 570 m || 
|-id=864 bgcolor=#d6d6d6
| 611864 ||  || — || April 18, 2007 || Kitt Peak || Spacewatch ||  || align=right | 3.2 km || 
|-id=865 bgcolor=#d6d6d6
| 611865 ||  || — || April 18, 2007 || Mount Lemmon || Mount Lemmon Survey ||  || align=right | 2.1 km || 
|-id=866 bgcolor=#d6d6d6
| 611866 ||  || — || March 18, 2007 || Kitt Peak || Spacewatch ||  || align=right | 2.6 km || 
|-id=867 bgcolor=#d6d6d6
| 611867 ||  || — || April 18, 2007 || Kitt Peak || Spacewatch ||  || align=right | 2.4 km || 
|-id=868 bgcolor=#d6d6d6
| 611868 ||  || — || April 18, 2007 || Kitt Peak || Spacewatch ||  || align=right | 2.4 km || 
|-id=869 bgcolor=#E9E9E9
| 611869 ||  || — || April 18, 2007 || Kitt Peak || Spacewatch ||  || align=right | 1.1 km || 
|-id=870 bgcolor=#d6d6d6
| 611870 ||  || — || April 18, 2007 || Kitt Peak || Spacewatch ||  || align=right | 2.5 km || 
|-id=871 bgcolor=#fefefe
| 611871 ||  || — || April 18, 2007 || Kitt Peak || Spacewatch ||  || align=right data-sort-value="0.61" | 610 m || 
|-id=872 bgcolor=#d6d6d6
| 611872 ||  || — || April 18, 2007 || Kitt Peak || Spacewatch ||  || align=right | 2.6 km || 
|-id=873 bgcolor=#d6d6d6
| 611873 ||  || — || March 20, 2007 || Mount Lemmon || Mount Lemmon Survey ||  || align=right | 2.7 km || 
|-id=874 bgcolor=#d6d6d6
| 611874 ||  || — || April 11, 2007 || Kitt Peak || Spacewatch ||  || align=right | 2.7 km || 
|-id=875 bgcolor=#d6d6d6
| 611875 ||  || — || October 10, 2004 || Kitt Peak || Spacewatch || EOS || align=right | 1.8 km || 
|-id=876 bgcolor=#fefefe
| 611876 ||  || — || January 24, 2003 || La Silla || A. Boattini, O. R. Hainaut ||  || align=right data-sort-value="0.75" | 750 m || 
|-id=877 bgcolor=#d6d6d6
| 611877 ||  || — || April 20, 2007 || Mount Lemmon || Mount Lemmon Survey ||  || align=right | 2.7 km || 
|-id=878 bgcolor=#d6d6d6
| 611878 ||  || — || April 20, 2007 || Mount Lemmon || Mount Lemmon Survey ||  || align=right | 2.1 km || 
|-id=879 bgcolor=#E9E9E9
| 611879 ||  || — || April 22, 2007 || Mount Lemmon || Mount Lemmon Survey ||  || align=right data-sort-value="0.98" | 980 m || 
|-id=880 bgcolor=#E9E9E9
| 611880 ||  || — || April 22, 2007 || Mount Lemmon || Mount Lemmon Survey ||  || align=right | 1.2 km || 
|-id=881 bgcolor=#d6d6d6
| 611881 ||  || — || April 22, 2007 || Mount Lemmon || Mount Lemmon Survey ||  || align=right | 2.3 km || 
|-id=882 bgcolor=#d6d6d6
| 611882 ||  || — || April 11, 2007 || Catalina || CSS || Tj (2.99) || align=right | 3.6 km || 
|-id=883 bgcolor=#d6d6d6
| 611883 ||  || — || April 20, 2007 || Kitt Peak || Spacewatch ||  || align=right | 3.2 km || 
|-id=884 bgcolor=#E9E9E9
| 611884 ||  || — || April 20, 2007 || Kitt Peak || Spacewatch ||  || align=right | 1.3 km || 
|-id=885 bgcolor=#d6d6d6
| 611885 ||  || — || April 20, 2007 || Kitt Peak || Spacewatch ||  || align=right | 2.2 km || 
|-id=886 bgcolor=#E9E9E9
| 611886 ||  || — || April 20, 2007 || Kitt Peak || Spacewatch ||  || align=right data-sort-value="0.97" | 970 m || 
|-id=887 bgcolor=#fefefe
| 611887 ||  || — || April 20, 2007 || Kitt Peak || Spacewatch ||  || align=right data-sort-value="0.59" | 590 m || 
|-id=888 bgcolor=#d6d6d6
| 611888 ||  || — || April 20, 2007 || Kitt Peak || Spacewatch ||  || align=right | 2.5 km || 
|-id=889 bgcolor=#d6d6d6
| 611889 ||  || — || April 20, 2007 || Kitt Peak || Spacewatch ||  || align=right | 2.3 km || 
|-id=890 bgcolor=#E9E9E9
| 611890 ||  || — || October 4, 2004 || Palomar || NEAT ||  || align=right | 1.3 km || 
|-id=891 bgcolor=#d6d6d6
| 611891 ||  || — || April 22, 2007 || Kitt Peak || Spacewatch ||  || align=right | 2.5 km || 
|-id=892 bgcolor=#fefefe
| 611892 ||  || — || April 22, 2007 || Mount Lemmon || Mount Lemmon Survey ||  || align=right data-sort-value="0.68" | 680 m || 
|-id=893 bgcolor=#d6d6d6
| 611893 ||  || — || April 20, 2007 || Kitt Peak || Spacewatch ||  || align=right | 3.2 km || 
|-id=894 bgcolor=#d6d6d6
| 611894 ||  || — || April 22, 2007 || Mount Lemmon || Mount Lemmon Survey ||  || align=right | 2.5 km || 
|-id=895 bgcolor=#d6d6d6
| 611895 ||  || — || April 24, 2007 || Kitt Peak || Spacewatch ||  || align=right | 2.8 km || 
|-id=896 bgcolor=#d6d6d6
| 611896 ||  || — || January 7, 2006 || Kitt Peak || Spacewatch ||  || align=right | 2.0 km || 
|-id=897 bgcolor=#d6d6d6
| 611897 ||  || — || April 19, 2007 || Mount Lemmon || Mount Lemmon Survey ||  || align=right | 2.3 km || 
|-id=898 bgcolor=#d6d6d6
| 611898 ||  || — || March 14, 2007 || Mount Lemmon || Mount Lemmon Survey ||  || align=right | 2.1 km || 
|-id=899 bgcolor=#fefefe
| 611899 ||  || — || April 23, 2007 || Kitt Peak || Spacewatch ||  || align=right data-sort-value="0.78" | 780 m || 
|-id=900 bgcolor=#E9E9E9
| 611900 ||  || — || April 14, 2007 || Mount Lemmon || Mount Lemmon Survey ||  || align=right data-sort-value="0.77" | 770 m || 
|}

611901–612000 

|-bgcolor=#E9E9E9
| 611901 ||  || — || April 25, 2007 || Mount Lemmon || Mount Lemmon Survey ||  || align=right | 1.5 km || 
|-id=902 bgcolor=#fefefe
| 611902 ||  || — || April 15, 2007 || Catalina || CSS ||  || align=right | 1.0 km || 
|-id=903 bgcolor=#d6d6d6
| 611903 ||  || — || April 24, 2007 || Kitt Peak || Spacewatch ||  || align=right | 2.8 km || 
|-id=904 bgcolor=#E9E9E9
| 611904 ||  || — || April 25, 2007 || Kitt Peak || Spacewatch ||  || align=right data-sort-value="0.93" | 930 m || 
|-id=905 bgcolor=#d6d6d6
| 611905 ||  || — || March 15, 2007 || Mount Lemmon || Mount Lemmon Survey ||  || align=right | 2.7 km || 
|-id=906 bgcolor=#d6d6d6
| 611906 ||  || — || April 18, 2007 || Mount Lemmon || Mount Lemmon Survey ||  || align=right | 2.7 km || 
|-id=907 bgcolor=#d6d6d6
| 611907 ||  || — || April 16, 2007 || Mount Lemmon || Mount Lemmon Survey ||  || align=right | 1.7 km || 
|-id=908 bgcolor=#d6d6d6
| 611908 ||  || — || March 26, 2007 || Mount Lemmon || Mount Lemmon Survey ||  || align=right | 2.9 km || 
|-id=909 bgcolor=#d6d6d6
| 611909 ||  || — || April 18, 2007 || Mount Lemmon || Mount Lemmon Survey ||  || align=right | 2.7 km || 
|-id=910 bgcolor=#d6d6d6
| 611910 ||  || — || April 25, 2007 || Mount Lemmon || Mount Lemmon Survey ||  || align=right | 2.4 km || 
|-id=911 bgcolor=#d6d6d6
| 611911 ||  || — || October 10, 2015 || Haleakala || Pan-STARRS ||  || align=right | 2.9 km || 
|-id=912 bgcolor=#d6d6d6
| 611912 ||  || — || April 25, 2007 || Kitt Peak || Spacewatch ||  || align=right | 2.6 km || 
|-id=913 bgcolor=#E9E9E9
| 611913 ||  || — || July 4, 2016 || Haleakala || Pan-STARRS ||  || align=right data-sort-value="0.87" | 870 m || 
|-id=914 bgcolor=#d6d6d6
| 611914 ||  || — || April 20, 2007 || Kitt Peak || Spacewatch ||  || align=right | 2.6 km || 
|-id=915 bgcolor=#d6d6d6
| 611915 ||  || — || December 5, 2015 || Haleakala || Pan-STARRS ||  || align=right | 2.2 km || 
|-id=916 bgcolor=#d6d6d6
| 611916 ||  || — || April 24, 2007 || Mount Lemmon || Mount Lemmon Survey ||  || align=right | 2.6 km || 
|-id=917 bgcolor=#d6d6d6
| 611917 ||  || — || November 6, 2010 || Mount Lemmon || Mount Lemmon Survey ||  || align=right | 2.2 km || 
|-id=918 bgcolor=#fefefe
| 611918 ||  || — || March 18, 2010 || Mount Lemmon || Mount Lemmon Survey ||  || align=right data-sort-value="0.48" | 480 m || 
|-id=919 bgcolor=#E9E9E9
| 611919 ||  || — || March 25, 2007 || Mount Lemmon || Mount Lemmon Survey ||  || align=right | 1.4 km || 
|-id=920 bgcolor=#E9E9E9
| 611920 ||  || — || April 5, 2011 || Mount Lemmon || Mount Lemmon Survey ||  || align=right | 1.2 km || 
|-id=921 bgcolor=#d6d6d6
| 611921 ||  || — || April 25, 2007 || Catalina || CSS ||  || align=right | 3.4 km || 
|-id=922 bgcolor=#d6d6d6
| 611922 ||  || — || April 23, 2007 || Mount Lemmon || Mount Lemmon Survey ||  || align=right | 3.3 km || 
|-id=923 bgcolor=#d6d6d6
| 611923 ||  || — || April 19, 2007 || Mount Lemmon || Mount Lemmon Survey ||  || align=right | 2.6 km || 
|-id=924 bgcolor=#d6d6d6
| 611924 ||  || — || April 19, 2013 || Haleakala || Pan-STARRS ||  || align=right | 2.4 km || 
|-id=925 bgcolor=#d6d6d6
| 611925 ||  || — || April 19, 2007 || Mount Lemmon || Mount Lemmon Survey ||  || align=right | 2.1 km || 
|-id=926 bgcolor=#d6d6d6
| 611926 ||  || — || August 28, 2014 || Haleakala || Pan-STARRS ||  || align=right | 2.1 km || 
|-id=927 bgcolor=#d6d6d6
| 611927 ||  || — || April 22, 2007 || Kitt Peak || Spacewatch ||  || align=right | 2.2 km || 
|-id=928 bgcolor=#d6d6d6
| 611928 ||  || — || April 20, 2007 || Kitt Peak || Spacewatch ||  || align=right | 2.9 km || 
|-id=929 bgcolor=#E9E9E9
| 611929 ||  || — || April 19, 2007 || Kitt Peak || Spacewatch ||  || align=right data-sort-value="0.68" | 680 m || 
|-id=930 bgcolor=#E9E9E9
| 611930 ||  || — || April 18, 2007 || Mount Lemmon || Mount Lemmon Survey ||  || align=right | 1.1 km || 
|-id=931 bgcolor=#d6d6d6
| 611931 ||  || — || April 23, 2007 || Mount Lemmon || Mount Lemmon Survey ||  || align=right | 2.4 km || 
|-id=932 bgcolor=#E9E9E9
| 611932 ||  || — || May 9, 2007 || Mount Lemmon || Mount Lemmon Survey ||  || align=right data-sort-value="0.70" | 700 m || 
|-id=933 bgcolor=#d6d6d6
| 611933 ||  || — || May 9, 2007 || Mount Lemmon || Mount Lemmon Survey ||  || align=right | 2.1 km || 
|-id=934 bgcolor=#E9E9E9
| 611934 ||  || — || May 10, 2007 || Mount Lemmon || Mount Lemmon Survey ||  || align=right | 1.0 km || 
|-id=935 bgcolor=#d6d6d6
| 611935 ||  || — || September 30, 2003 || Kitt Peak || Spacewatch ||  || align=right | 3.4 km || 
|-id=936 bgcolor=#d6d6d6
| 611936 ||  || — || March 25, 2007 || Mount Lemmon || Mount Lemmon Survey ||  || align=right | 3.1 km || 
|-id=937 bgcolor=#fefefe
| 611937 ||  || — || May 11, 2007 || Mount Lemmon || Mount Lemmon Survey ||  || align=right data-sort-value="0.52" | 520 m || 
|-id=938 bgcolor=#d6d6d6
| 611938 ||  || — || May 11, 2007 || Mount Lemmon || Mount Lemmon Survey ||  || align=right | 2.1 km || 
|-id=939 bgcolor=#E9E9E9
| 611939 ||  || — || May 11, 2007 || Mount Lemmon || Mount Lemmon Survey ||  || align=right data-sort-value="0.80" | 800 m || 
|-id=940 bgcolor=#d6d6d6
| 611940 ||  || — || May 9, 2007 || Kitt Peak || Spacewatch ||  || align=right | 2.8 km || 
|-id=941 bgcolor=#d6d6d6
| 611941 ||  || — || February 2, 2006 || Kitt Peak || Spacewatch ||  || align=right | 2.8 km || 
|-id=942 bgcolor=#d6d6d6
| 611942 ||  || — || May 9, 2007 || Mount Lemmon || Mount Lemmon Survey ||  || align=right | 3.3 km || 
|-id=943 bgcolor=#d6d6d6
| 611943 ||  || — || May 10, 2007 || Mount Lemmon || Mount Lemmon Survey ||  || align=right | 2.7 km || 
|-id=944 bgcolor=#E9E9E9
| 611944 ||  || — || May 10, 2007 || Mount Lemmon || Mount Lemmon Survey ||  || align=right data-sort-value="0.72" | 720 m || 
|-id=945 bgcolor=#d6d6d6
| 611945 ||  || — || April 20, 2007 || Kitt Peak || Spacewatch ||  || align=right | 3.2 km || 
|-id=946 bgcolor=#E9E9E9
| 611946 ||  || — || January 31, 2006 || Kitt Peak || Spacewatch ||  || align=right data-sort-value="0.94" | 940 m || 
|-id=947 bgcolor=#fefefe
| 611947 ||  || — || April 19, 2007 || Mount Lemmon || Mount Lemmon Survey ||  || align=right data-sort-value="0.46" | 460 m || 
|-id=948 bgcolor=#d6d6d6
| 611948 ||  || — || May 12, 2007 || Mount Lemmon || Mount Lemmon Survey ||  || align=right | 2.8 km || 
|-id=949 bgcolor=#fefefe
| 611949 ||  || — || April 11, 2007 || Kitt Peak || Spacewatch || H || align=right data-sort-value="0.58" | 580 m || 
|-id=950 bgcolor=#E9E9E9
| 611950 ||  || — || May 14, 2007 || Siding Spring || SSS ||  || align=right | 1.3 km || 
|-id=951 bgcolor=#fefefe
| 611951 ||  || — || March 10, 2007 || Palomar || NEAT ||  || align=right data-sort-value="0.68" | 680 m || 
|-id=952 bgcolor=#fefefe
| 611952 ||  || — || April 18, 2007 || Mount Lemmon || Mount Lemmon Survey ||  || align=right data-sort-value="0.53" | 530 m || 
|-id=953 bgcolor=#d6d6d6
| 611953 ||  || — || May 10, 2007 || Mount Lemmon || Mount Lemmon Survey ||  || align=right | 4.1 km || 
|-id=954 bgcolor=#d6d6d6
| 611954 ||  || — || May 13, 2007 || Mount Lemmon || Mount Lemmon Survey ||  || align=right | 2.4 km || 
|-id=955 bgcolor=#fefefe
| 611955 ||  || — || May 11, 2007 || Mount Lemmon || Mount Lemmon Survey ||  || align=right data-sort-value="0.92" | 920 m || 
|-id=956 bgcolor=#d6d6d6
| 611956 ||  || — || July 3, 2008 || Mount Lemmon || Mount Lemmon Survey ||  || align=right | 3.0 km || 
|-id=957 bgcolor=#E9E9E9
| 611957 ||  || — || April 15, 2015 || Mount Lemmon || Mount Lemmon Survey ||  || align=right | 1.3 km || 
|-id=958 bgcolor=#d6d6d6
| 611958 ||  || — || February 13, 2011 || Mount Lemmon || Mount Lemmon Survey ||  || align=right | 2.7 km || 
|-id=959 bgcolor=#d6d6d6
| 611959 ||  || — || August 30, 2014 || Mount Lemmon || Mount Lemmon Survey ||  || align=right | 2.5 km || 
|-id=960 bgcolor=#d6d6d6
| 611960 ||  || — || September 27, 2009 || Mount Lemmon || Mount Lemmon Survey ||  || align=right | 3.0 km || 
|-id=961 bgcolor=#d6d6d6
| 611961 ||  || — || May 13, 2007 || Mount Lemmon || Mount Lemmon Survey ||  || align=right | 2.7 km || 
|-id=962 bgcolor=#d6d6d6
| 611962 ||  || — || January 10, 2006 || Kitt Peak || Spacewatch ||  || align=right | 3.1 km || 
|-id=963 bgcolor=#d6d6d6
| 611963 ||  || — || October 15, 2009 || Mount Lemmon || Mount Lemmon Survey ||  || align=right | 2.2 km || 
|-id=964 bgcolor=#d6d6d6
| 611964 ||  || — || January 8, 2011 || Mount Lemmon || Mount Lemmon Survey ||  || align=right | 2.4 km || 
|-id=965 bgcolor=#d6d6d6
| 611965 ||  || — || February 21, 2017 || Mount Lemmon || Mount Lemmon Survey ||  || align=right | 2.3 km || 
|-id=966 bgcolor=#E9E9E9
| 611966 ||  || — || January 28, 2014 || Mount Lemmon || Mount Lemmon Survey ||  || align=right | 1.0 km || 
|-id=967 bgcolor=#d6d6d6
| 611967 ||  || — || May 12, 2007 || Mount Lemmon || Mount Lemmon Survey ||  || align=right | 2.4 km || 
|-id=968 bgcolor=#d6d6d6
| 611968 ||  || — || April 26, 2007 || Mount Lemmon || Mount Lemmon Survey ||  || align=right | 2.5 km || 
|-id=969 bgcolor=#d6d6d6
| 611969 ||  || — || October 9, 2015 || Haleakala || Pan-STARRS ||  || align=right | 2.7 km || 
|-id=970 bgcolor=#E9E9E9
| 611970 ||  || — || May 25, 2007 || Mount Lemmon || Mount Lemmon Survey ||  || align=right | 1.1 km || 
|-id=971 bgcolor=#d6d6d6
| 611971 ||  || — || January 29, 2011 || Mount Lemmon || Mount Lemmon Survey ||  || align=right | 2.7 km || 
|-id=972 bgcolor=#E9E9E9
| 611972 ||  || — || May 26, 2007 || Mount Lemmon || Mount Lemmon Survey ||  || align=right data-sort-value="0.85" | 850 m || 
|-id=973 bgcolor=#d6d6d6
| 611973 ||  || — || June 5, 2007 || Bergisch Gladbach || W. Bickel ||  || align=right | 2.5 km || 
|-id=974 bgcolor=#d6d6d6
| 611974 ||  || — || May 16, 2007 || Mount Lemmon || Mount Lemmon Survey ||  || align=right | 2.8 km || 
|-id=975 bgcolor=#fefefe
| 611975 ||  || — || June 8, 2007 || Kitt Peak || Spacewatch ||  || align=right data-sort-value="0.57" | 570 m || 
|-id=976 bgcolor=#d6d6d6
| 611976 ||  || — || May 13, 2007 || Mount Lemmon || Mount Lemmon Survey ||  || align=right | 2.2 km || 
|-id=977 bgcolor=#E9E9E9
| 611977 ||  || — || April 24, 2007 || Mount Lemmon || Mount Lemmon Survey ||  || align=right | 1.1 km || 
|-id=978 bgcolor=#E9E9E9
| 611978 ||  || — || May 13, 2007 || Kitt Peak || Spacewatch ||  || align=right data-sort-value="0.80" | 800 m || 
|-id=979 bgcolor=#E9E9E9
| 611979 ||  || — || June 12, 2007 || Kitt Peak || Spacewatch ||  || align=right | 1.1 km || 
|-id=980 bgcolor=#E9E9E9
| 611980 ||  || — || June 11, 2007 || Mauna Kea || Mauna Kea Obs. ||  || align=right | 1.4 km || 
|-id=981 bgcolor=#E9E9E9
| 611981 ||  || — || April 24, 2007 || Mount Lemmon || Mount Lemmon Survey ||  || align=right data-sort-value="0.91" | 910 m || 
|-id=982 bgcolor=#d6d6d6
| 611982 ||  || — || June 10, 2007 || Kitt Peak || Spacewatch ||  || align=right | 2.5 km || 
|-id=983 bgcolor=#E9E9E9
| 611983 ||  || — || June 10, 2007 || Kitt Peak || Spacewatch ||  || align=right | 1.2 km || 
|-id=984 bgcolor=#d6d6d6
| 611984 ||  || — || June 10, 2007 || Kitt Peak || Spacewatch ||  || align=right | 2.8 km || 
|-id=985 bgcolor=#d6d6d6
| 611985 ||  || — || March 24, 2006 || Mount Lemmon || Mount Lemmon Survey ||  || align=right | 2.6 km || 
|-id=986 bgcolor=#d6d6d6
| 611986 ||  || — || April 23, 2007 || Mount Lemmon || Mount Lemmon Survey ||  || align=right | 2.6 km || 
|-id=987 bgcolor=#E9E9E9
| 611987 ||  || — || June 14, 2007 || Kitt Peak || Spacewatch ||  || align=right data-sort-value="0.87" | 870 m || 
|-id=988 bgcolor=#E9E9E9
| 611988 ||  || — || November 22, 2008 || Mount Lemmon || Mount Lemmon Survey ||  || align=right | 1.2 km || 
|-id=989 bgcolor=#fefefe
| 611989 ||  || — || May 14, 2015 || Haleakala || Pan-STARRS || H || align=right data-sort-value="0.49" | 490 m || 
|-id=990 bgcolor=#d6d6d6
| 611990 ||  || — || March 16, 2012 || Mount Lemmon || Mount Lemmon Survey ||  || align=right | 1.9 km || 
|-id=991 bgcolor=#E9E9E9
| 611991 ||  || — || August 6, 2016 || Haleakala || Pan-STARRS ||  || align=right | 1.1 km || 
|-id=992 bgcolor=#d6d6d6
| 611992 ||  || — || May 10, 2007 || Mount Lemmon || Mount Lemmon Survey ||  || align=right | 3.7 km || 
|-id=993 bgcolor=#E9E9E9
| 611993 ||  || — || March 25, 2007 || Mount Lemmon || Mount Lemmon Survey ||  || align=right | 1.2 km || 
|-id=994 bgcolor=#E9E9E9
| 611994 ||  || — || May 16, 2007 || Kitt Peak || Spacewatch ||  || align=right data-sort-value="0.98" | 980 m || 
|-id=995 bgcolor=#E9E9E9
| 611995 ||  || — || May 26, 2007 || Mount Lemmon || Mount Lemmon Survey ||  || align=right data-sort-value="0.73" | 730 m || 
|-id=996 bgcolor=#E9E9E9
| 611996 ||  || — || June 17, 2007 || Kitt Peak || Spacewatch ||  || align=right data-sort-value="0.99" | 990 m || 
|-id=997 bgcolor=#d6d6d6
| 611997 ||  || — || May 13, 2007 || Mount Lemmon || Mount Lemmon Survey ||  || align=right | 2.5 km || 
|-id=998 bgcolor=#d6d6d6
| 611998 ||  || — || June 21, 2007 || Mount Lemmon || Mount Lemmon Survey || 7:4 || align=right | 3.0 km || 
|-id=999 bgcolor=#E9E9E9
| 611999 ||  || — || May 7, 2007 || Mount Lemmon || Mount Lemmon Survey ||  || align=right | 1.2 km || 
|-id=000 bgcolor=#E9E9E9
| 612000 ||  || — || June 21, 2007 || Mount Lemmon || Mount Lemmon Survey ||  || align=right | 1.2 km || 
|}

References

External links 
 Discovery Circumstances: Numbered Minor Planets (610001)–(615000) (IAU Minor Planet Center)

0611